= François de Charette =

French military officer and politician (1763–1796)

François Athanase de Charette
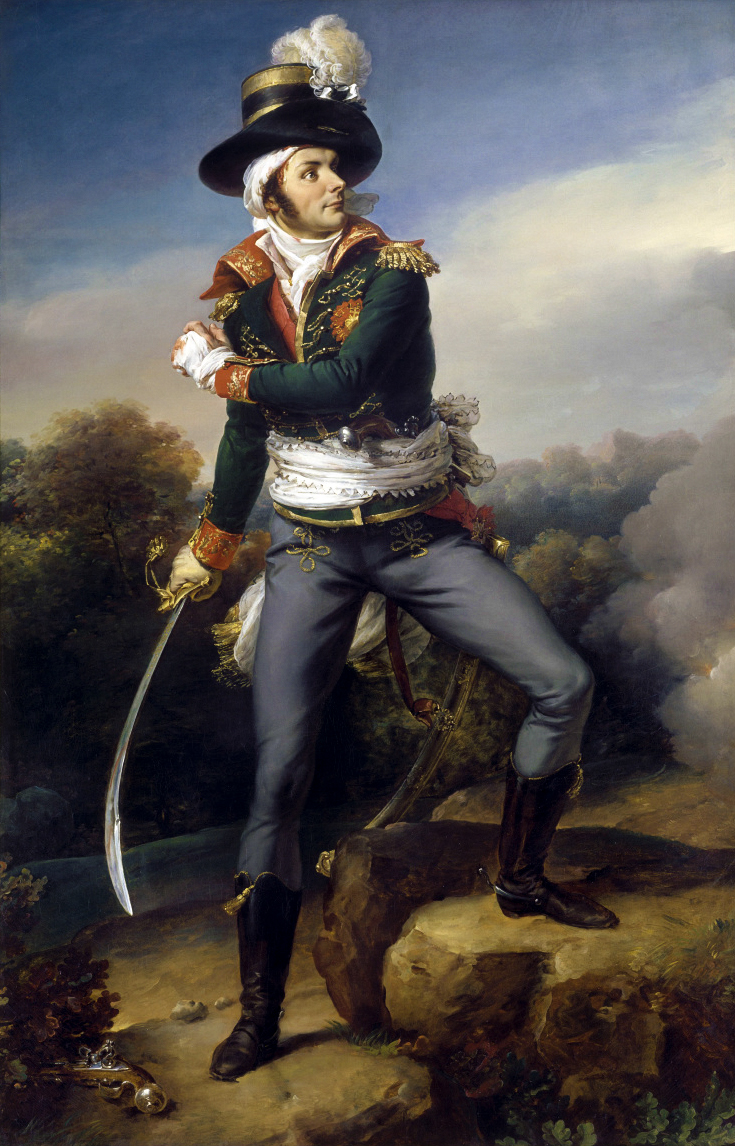
- François Athanase Charette de La Contrie, oil on canvas by Paulin Guérin, 1819
- Born: 2 May 1763; Couffé, Brittany
- Died: 29 March 1796 (aged 32); Nantes, Brittany
- Military career
- Allegiance: Kingdom of France (1779–1790); Catholic and Royal Armies (1793–1796)
- Branch: French Navy; Catholic and Royal Army
- Service years: 1779–1796
- Rank: Lieutenant General
- Nickname: King of the Vendée
- Conflicts: American Revolutionary War; War in the Vendée; Battle of Nantes; Battle of Luçon; Battle of Tiffauges; Battle of Montaigu; Battle of Saint-Fulgent; First Battle of Noirmoutier

François Athanase de Charette de la Contrie (French pronunciation: [fʁɑ̃swa atanaz də ʃaʁɛt də la kɔ̃tʁi]; 2 May 1763 – 29 March 1796) was a French military officer and a royalist general during the War in the Vendée.

Born into a family of the minor Breton nobility, Charette began his military career in 1779 as a Garde de la Marine in Brest. He immediately took part in the American Revolutionary War, first off the French coast and then in the West Indies. After the peace, he took part in several campaigns in the North Sea, the West Indies and the Mediterranean. He was promoted to lieutenant de vaisseau in 1787 and resigned in 1790.

Married that same year to Marie-Angélique Josnet de La Doussetière, Charette inherited the Fonteclose manor house in La Garnache, in the Vendée. It was there, in March 1793, that peasants rebelling against the levée en masse (general conscription) came to fetch him to make him their leader.

Between March and June, Charette struggled to establish himself as the commander of the insurgents in the Machecoul and Legé regions. On 30 April, the various Vendée armies united to form the Catholic and Royal Army, but in practice Charette continued to act independently. On 12 December 1793, he was elected general of the Catholic and Royal Army of Lower Poitou. His command then extended across southern Loire-Atlantique and northwestern Vendée. Although weakened by a series of successive defeats towards the end of 1793, Charette nevertheless managed to escape the infernal columns that ravaged the Vendée in the early months of 1794.

In December 1794, Charette agreed to enter into talks with representatives of the Thermidorian Convention and, on 17 February 1795, he concluded a peace treaty and recognised the Republic during the negotiations at La Jaunaye. However, he took up arms again on 24 May, after establishing contact with the exiled princes, United Kingdom, the émigrés and the Chouans of Brittany. In July, Louis XVIII recognised Charette as Commander-in-Chief of the Catholic and Royal Army.

The resumption of hostilities, however, proved disastrous. Abandoned by his men, Charette was captured on 23 March 1796 in the woods of La Chabotterie. Sentenced to death, he was shot six days later in Nantes, on Place Viarme. His death marked the end of the Second War in the Vendée.

Charette's prolonged resistance and defiance of Republican authority secured him a lasting place in the historical memory of the Vendéan uprising, where he is often regarded as one of its defining military heroes. Nevertheless, his historical legacy remains deeply contested. His strategic decisions, rivalries with fellow royalist commanders and association with acts of violence have contributed to his reputation as one of the most controversial figures of the Vendéan counter-revolution, including within royalist historiography itself.

Charette's great-nephew Athanase-Charles-Marie Charette de la Contrie was a noted military leader and great-grandson of Charles X of France.

== Life ==
=== Early activities ===
A nobleman born in Couffé, arrondissement of Ancenis, Charette served in the French Navy under Toussaint-Guillaume Picquet de la Motte, notably during the American War of Independence, and became lieutenant de vaisseau. He notably served on the 74-gun naval warship Hercule, under Puget-Bras.

Following the outbreak of the French Revolution, he quit the Navy in 1789 and emigrated to Koblenz (Trier) in 1792 (a common move for royalist aristocrats). He soon returned to France to live at his property in La Garnache, and became one of the royalist volunteers who assisted in defending King Louis XVI and Marie Antoinette from physical harm during the mob attack on Tuileries Palace (the Insurrection of 10 August 1792); arrested in Angers, he was released through the intervention of Charles François Dumouriez.

=== Vendée War ===
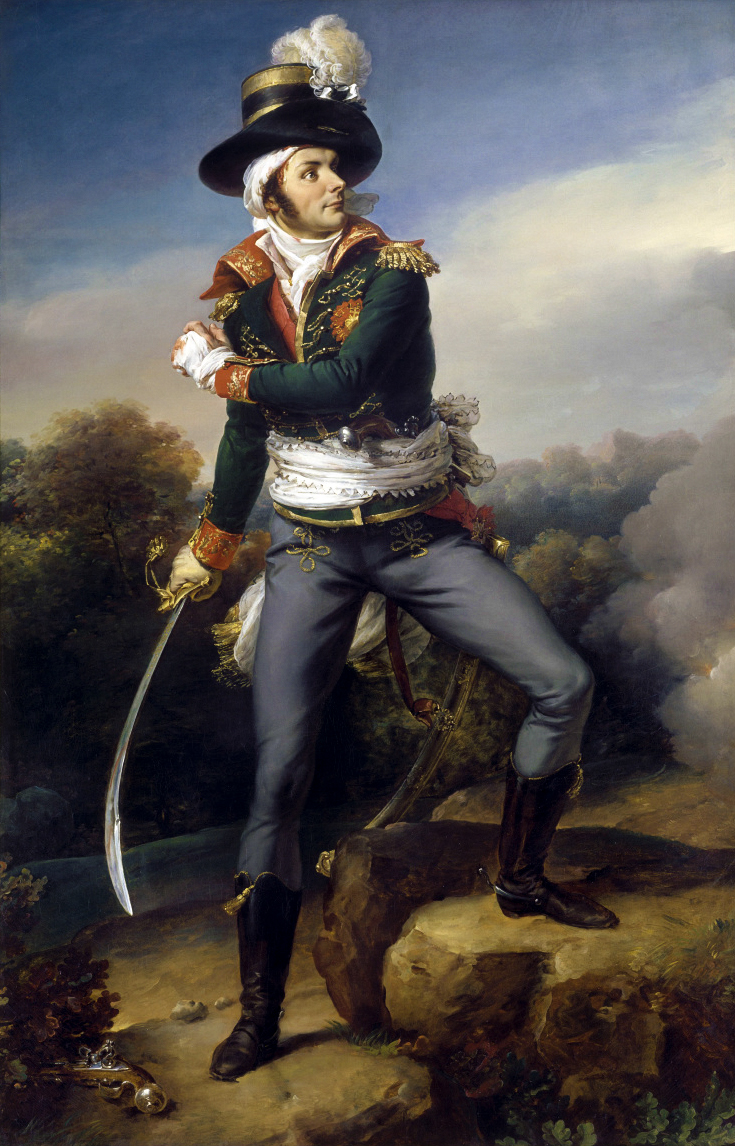
François Athanase de Charette de la Contrie, by Jean-Baptiste Paulin Guérin (1819)

In 1793, the War in the Vendée against the French First Republic broke out, and peasant fighters asked Charette to lead them. He joined Jacques Cathelineau after the taking of Saumur in June 1793 and fought in most battles of the Catholic and Royal Army. On 19 September 1793, he participated in the victorious Battle of Tiffauges. Afterwards, he and Louis Marie de Lescure had marched on Saint-Fulgent to pursue Jean-Baptiste Kléber, who had escaped. Charette won another victory over the Republicans at the First Battle of Noirmoutier. Some of the captured soldiers took part in the Machecoul Massacres and a quarter of them were executed for retribution by Charette's troops, against his orders. After the Vendean leaders split in September 1793, he and his men retreated. He became the leader of the Lower Vendée and successfully used guerrilla warfare against the Republican troops, capturing a Republican camp in Saint-Christophe-du-Ligneron, near Challans, but ran out of supplies and was decisively attacked by the troops of Nicolas Haxo. Trapped on the Isle of Bouin, Charette, with fellow leader Jean-Baptiste de Couëtus, learned of an escape route from a local to the isle. Leaving behind all guns, ammunition, horses, refugees, and the wounded, Charette, Couëtus, and their men swam through the marshes to Châteauneuf. By a stroke of luck, Charette met up with the army of Jean-Baptiste Joly, and both he and Charette retaliated by circling Haxo, gaining back supplies and distracting the Republican army from the refugees. Haxo later attacked the Isle of Noirmoutier, with Louis Turreau, which had been taken by Charette the month before, and after promising life to the inhabitants if they surrendered, against Haxo's command Turreau killed most men, women and children on the isle at the steps of the local church (La chapelle de la Pitié), including d'Elbée who had taken refuge there after sustaining 14 wounds at the Second Battle of Cholet.

After this, Charette's army returned and collected reinforcements; Revolutionary brutality and the 'infernal columns' sent by the Convention to destroy the Vendée forced many peasants to join Charette's army merely for safety. Charette won a victory at Saint-Fulgent, only to be chased into hiding in the forest of Grala. He emerged to attack Les Brouzils; he was wounded in the arm but kept fighting until the end. After obtaining food for his starving army, Charette was brought to La Morière, a convent near Machecoul, to recover from his wound; he was only able to rest there for a few days when his location was betrayed, and the Republicans surrounded the convent. Warned, he was able to escape, but the nuns and a large number of the refugees who had come with Charette's army and had hidden in the church were massacred.

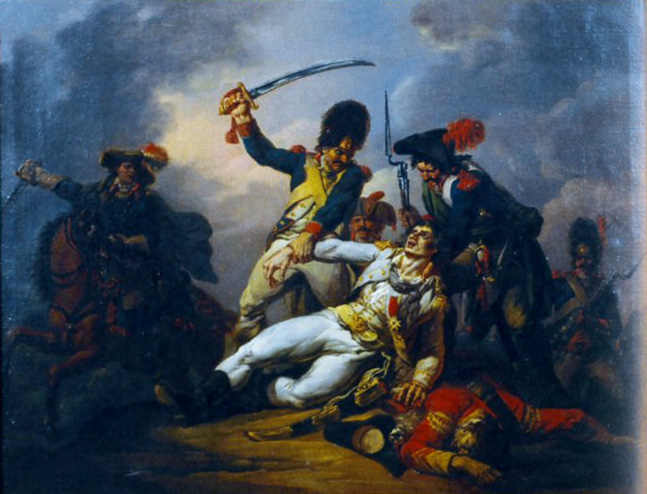
The Capture of Charette, by Louis Joseph Watteau, 1796

=== Defeat ===
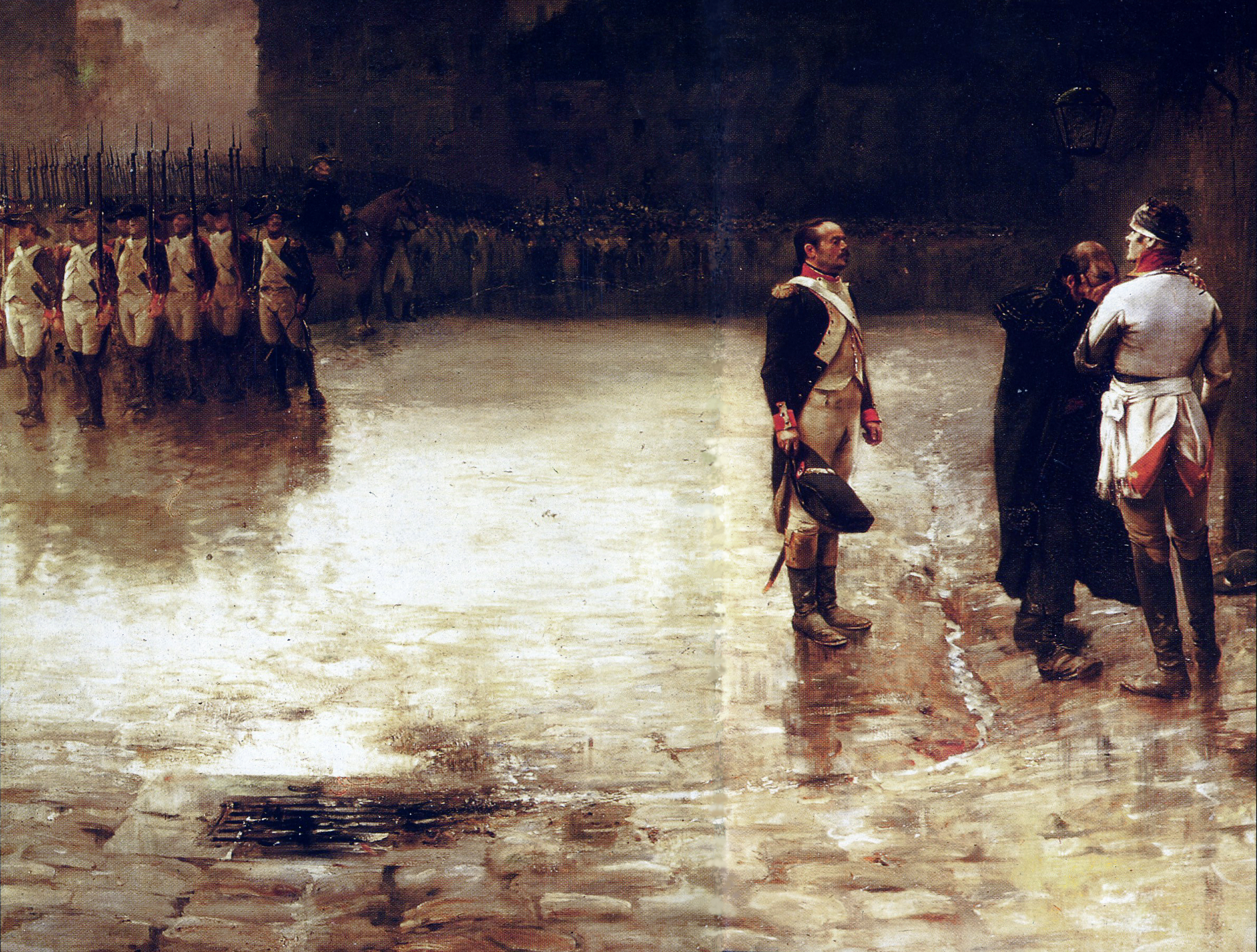
Execution of General Charette, in Nantes, March 1796, by Julien Le Blant

On 17 February 1795, after being introduced to it by his sister, Charette signed the Treaty of La Jaunaye with the emissaries of the National Convention, which included freedom of religion guarantees and excluded the conscription of local peasants from the levée en masse. The republicans soon reneged on the treaty terms, repudiating the guarantees of religious freedom; they began conscripting peasants again. They also murdered thousands of royalist prisoners including the Bishop of Dol, Urbain-René de Hercé. Charette and his men returned to the fight again in July and moved to help the planned invasion at Quiberon by French royalist émigrés with assistance from the British Royal Navy.

Count of Artois, the Bourbon successor to the throne of France, made him Lieutenant General and ordered preparations for a royal return, which did not eventuate. Charette remained loyal to the old House of Bourbon and Catholicism, as did his men and most Vendean and Breton peasants. He and all the loyal royalists later refused to join the liberal Orléanists. After the failure of the Quiberon expedition, General Lazare Hoche pursued Charette and his men. Charette was wounded but escaped. However, due to a lack of munitions, he was eventually captured outside La Chabotterie and taken to Nantes for a trial. He was sentenced to death by a republican court and then taken to the town square in procession for a public execution by firing squad. A plaque has been erected and still stands at the place where he was shot. Today, memorial ceremonies continue to take place there.

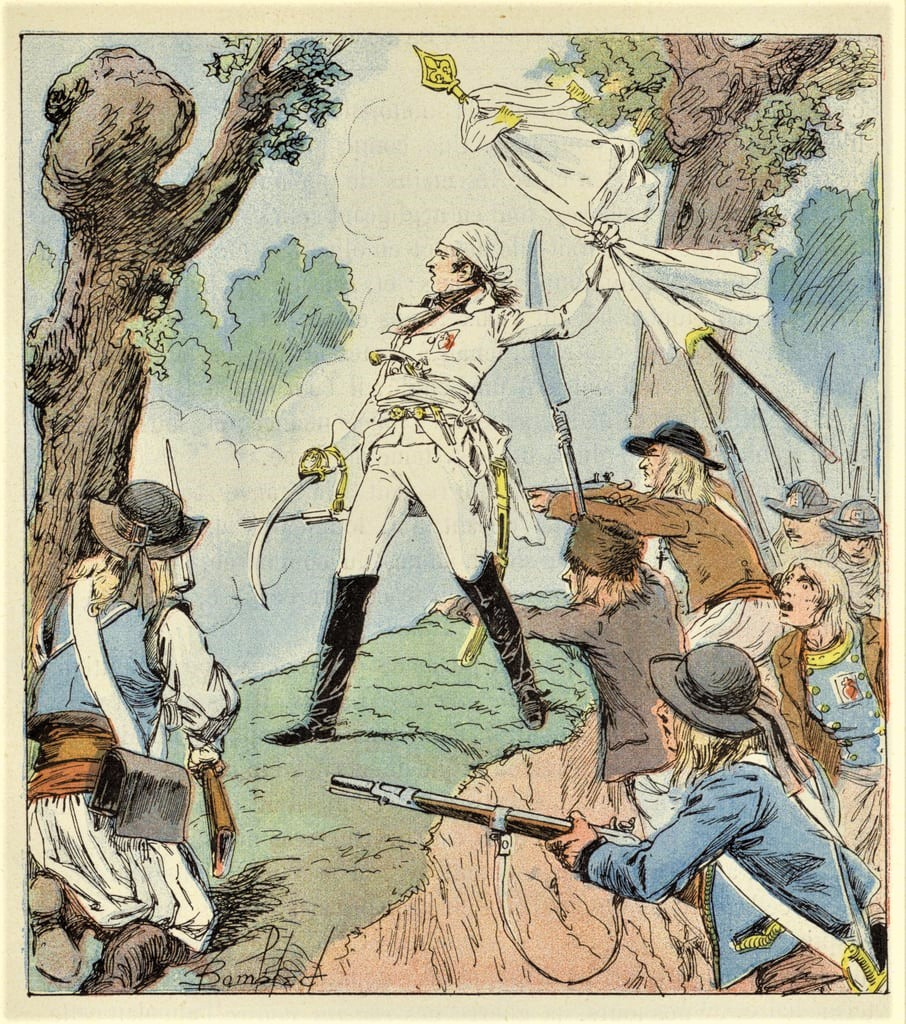
François Athanase Charette de La Contrie, by Louis Bombled

Charette was described by Napoleon as a great character and military leader who "shows genius".

== Depictions in films and popular culture ==
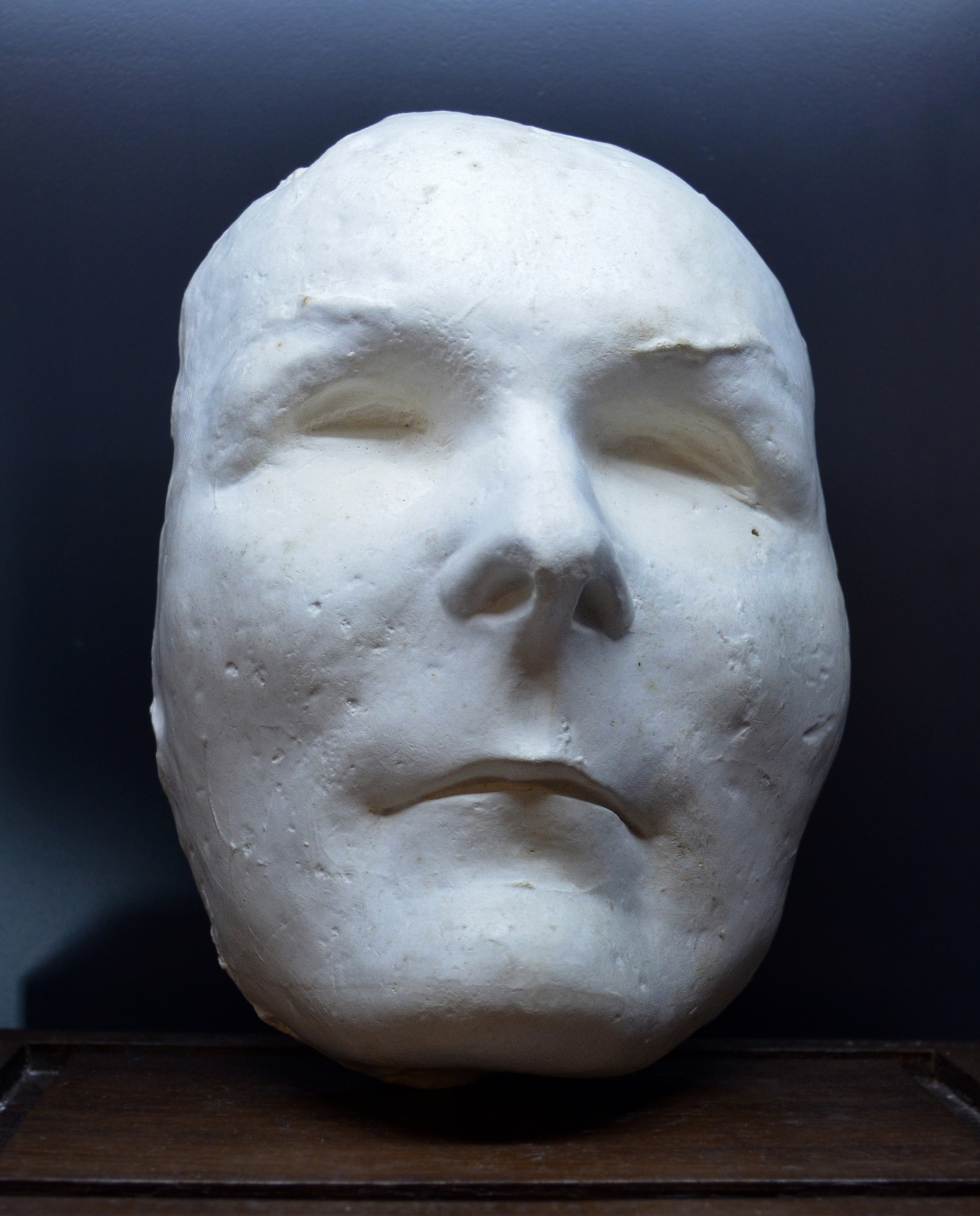
Death mask of François de Charette

Charette appears in the episode "The Frogs and the Lobsters" of the Hornblower film/television series, played by John Shrapnel. Charette is a royalist general in exile who, with the support of the British Royal Navy, attempts and fails to rally the surviving royalists and raise an army in France to restore the king to power. Unlike his real-life counterpart, the television adaptation has him fluent in English, and he is slain in battle while defending a captured fortification two years after his actual death.

Since 2018, Charette has been the lead character of Le Dernier Panache ("The Last Plume") at the French theme park Puy du Fou. The show depicts a romanticised version of his life story.

He appears as the protagonist of the French film Vaincre ou mourir, which was released in 2022.

== See also ==
- Henri-Charles de Beaumanoir of Lavardin
- Charette family
- Battle of Bouin

== Sources ==
- Anne Bernet, Charette, Perrin, 2005
- Dumarcet, Lionel (1998). François Athanase Charette de la Contrie : une histoire véritable. Paris : Le Grand livre du mois. ISBN 9782702818497. OCLC 468220116.
- Michel de Saint-Pierre, Monsieur de Charette, La Table Ronde, 1977
- George J. Hill, The Story of the War in La Vendée and the Little Chouannerie (New York: D. & J. Sadlier & Co. n.d.)
