= Battle of Nantes =

1793 battle of the War in the Vendée

Coordinates: 47.2181°N 1.5528°W

- Part of the War in the Vendée
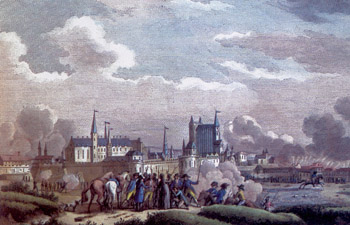
- Attack of Nantes by the Vendéens by Swebach-Desfontaines, 1794-1807
Date	29 June 1793
Location	Nantes, Loire-Inférieure, France
Result	French Republican victory

Belligerents
(France) French Republic	French Royalists

Commanders and leaders
(France) René-Gaston Baco (France) Jean de Canclaux (France) Jean-Michel Beysser	Jacques Cathelineau †; Prince de Talmont; Maurice d'Elbée; Marquis Charles; Jean-Nicolas Stofflet; François de Charette

Strength
12,000 men	30,000 men 20 cannons

Casualties and losses
300 killed	1,500 killed

The Battle of Nantes was fought on 29 June 1793 during the War in the Vendée. In this engagement, French Republican forces successfully defended Nantes from a royalist attack led by Jacques Cathelineau, who was mortally wounded in the fighting. General Louis Marie Turreau wrote of it:

The siege of Nantes is perhaps the most important military event of our revolution. Perhaps the destinies of the Republic [herself] were tied to the resistance of this city.

== Background ==
France, at war with Austria since April 1792, became a republic in September 1792, the day after the Battle of Valmy. Former king Louis XVI was guillotined on 21 January 1793. The number of enemies of France increased when policies of the Girondin government caused most neighboring countries to enter the war against France, forming the First Coalition. To replace the army volunteers, who had reached the end of their conscription, the government decreed the raising of 300,000 men, by drawing lots, in early March 1793. This provoked a wave of protests in several regions. The most lasting revolt occurred in the Vendée region. To the opposition to conscription were added tensions that had existed since 1791 and the incomprehension over the execution of the king. In 1793, peasants from the south of the Nantes area (the Pays nantais) and from the Vendée placed themselves under the command of royalist leaders, some of whom were noblemen. Patriots from the towns around Nantes were forced to take refuge in the city in the face of this threat: some of them were killed, such as the mayor of La Chapelle-Heulin; 14 constitutional priests, favorable to the Republic, were murdered by the insurgents, with some being mutilated or having their throats cut.

Nantes was a prosperous city, enriched by maritime commerce, particularly the slave trade. The bourgeoisie that dominated it adopted the ideals of the French Revolution. The wealth of the city contrasted with the poverty of the countryside that surrounded it. This wealth was not evenly distributed, but the poorest residents of the city tended to support the most radical Republicans, unlike the inhabitants of the surrounding countryside. The city, then the seventh largest in France by population, was strategically important, since it was the last crossing point over the Loire before its estuary, as well as an important river and sea port. Control of the area by the insurgents would open up possible access for Coalition forces via the coast. Furthermore, insurgent Vendée had no capital, and a conquered Nantes could exercise this function.

== Preparations ==
On 20 June 1793, the Vendéen leaders met in Angers to determine a plan of action. Charette and Lyrot, who were absent, made it known through Lescure that they agreed to participate in an attack on Nantes, at the Pirmil bridge, south of the city. The command of the Catholic and Royal Army sent an ultimatum to the Republicans entrenched in Nantes, and resumed its advance towards the city. Ancenis was taken on June 24, and a new council was held, during which Jacques Cathelineau was confirmed as generalissimo. The assault was scheduled for 2 a.m. on 29 June. As the city's fortifications had been dismantled between 1760 and 1780, the choice was made to attack at several points. Charette, Lyrot and their 20,000 men were to assault the bridgehead south of the Loire, each on one bank of the Sèvre, respectively through Pont-Rousseau and Saint-Jacques. To the north, the army was divided in two: along the Loire, a contingent was to attack the "camp of Saint-Georges", where Republican troops were based, while further north Cathelineau was to cross the Erdre at Nort-sur-Erdre, to attack the town through the roads to Vannes and Rennes. All the northern troops began their march from Oudon on 27 June.

== Battle ==
That same day, 4,000 Vendéen rebels of Cathelineau and Maurice d'Elbée's army reached the bridge at Nort-sur-Erdre. The position was held by 600 Republicans led by Aimable Joseph Meuris. The battle was initially an artillery duel, then the two armies exchanged gunfire from one bank of the river to the other. The precision of the Republican cannons forced the Vendéens to retreat, and the depth of the Erdre prevented any crossing. During the night, the discovery of a ford 3 km upstream allowed some of Cathelineau's men to attack Meuris' from the rear. The Republican battalion, having suffered around 20 killed and 90 wounded, went into disarray and fell back towards Nantes. It was saved from destruction by the arrival, from Rennes, of the 11th and 13th volunteer battalions of Seine-et-Oise, and was able to reach the city.

This action thirty kilometers from the city delayed Cathelineau, and when, as expected, Charette had fired his cannons against the defensive system south of Nantes, on 29 June at 2 a.m., the assault was not launched simultaneously in the north. Lyrot had indeed attacked with his troops on the right bank of the Sèvre, but it was not until around 6 a.m. that the Vendéens arrived at Nantes from the north and east. They were spotted by an observation post located at the top of Nantes Cathedral, and the fighting began at around 7 a.m. at this location. To the south, as expected by the Republican command, the position was impregnable. It was thus in the north that the outcome of the battle was decided. While the detachment led by Charles de Bonchamps fought on the road to Paris, the bulk of the Catholic and Royal Army was concentrated on the access of the roads to Vannes and Rennes.

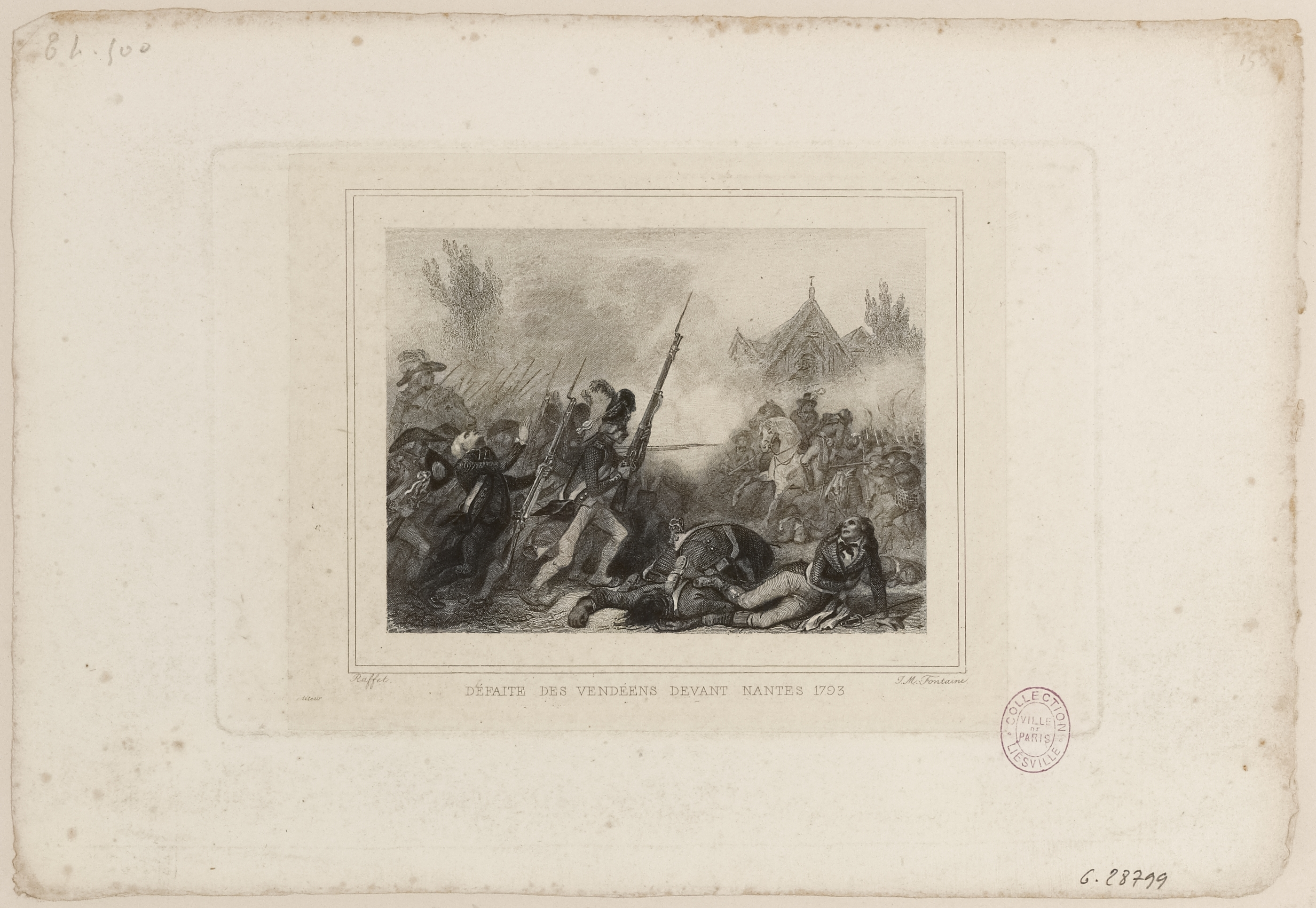
Defeat of the Vendéens in front of Nantes by Auguste Raffet, 1834

The insurgents' artillery was installed along the road to Rennes, threatening Port-Communeau Square and the seat of departmental government. The Republican fortified posts of Bel-Air, Hauts-Pavés and Miséricorde withstood the assault conducted by Cathelineau. To the east, part of Bonchamps' troops came up against the Republican entrenchments; two Vendéen chiefs, Fleuriot (brother of Jacques-Nicolas Fleuriot de La Freulière) and Mesnard, were put hors de combat and replaced by Autichamp. At midday, the assault seemed to have stopped. With the inconclusive outcome of the assault on the Rennes road, Cathelineau decided to try to force the Republican defense at the level of the Vannes road, where it was more stretched and vulnerable. The Vendéen generalissimo led the assault himself, on foot. Finally, the line gave way, but the Republican troops retreated in good order and continued to resist. The Miséricorde Cemetery was invested, as was the rue des Hauts-Pavés. The royalist troops managed to reach Viarme Square. The assault cost the attackers heavy losses, and Cathelineau was severely wounded at the square. The Republicans halted the Vendéen thrust and the insurgents fell back, beginning the retreat of the Catholic and Royal Army.

The total number of casualties was established after the battle, but the summary document has since been lost. Historians agree that there were about 300 dead on the Republican side, against 1,500 royalist insurgents killed. The quantity of corpses abandoned in the days following the fighting posed a sanitation problem, and on July 8, more than a week after the end of the battle, the department's directory had to take measures to bury the bodies still lying on the ground at the gates of the city. The wounded were equally numerous.

== Aftermath ==
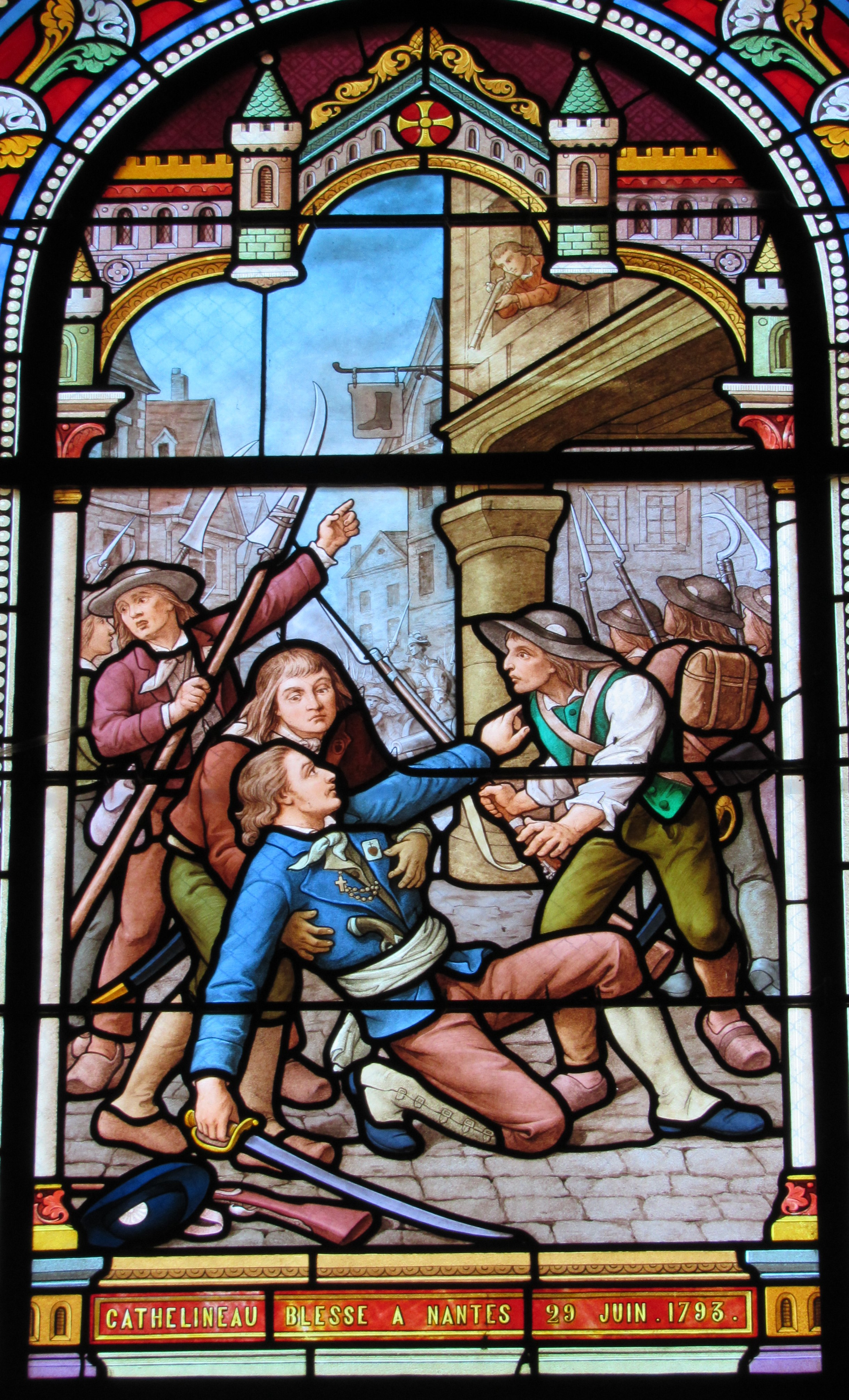
Jacques Cathelineau, mortally wounded at Nantes, as depicted in a stained glass window at the church of Beaupréau-en-Mauges

On the Republican side, the Battle of Nantes was not a resounding victory. The assault was repelled, but the city remained under siege, the troops were still mobilized, and the people of Nantes lived in fear of a new assault, with the surrounding countryside remaining in the hands of the insurgents. General Canclaux, after 1 July, led expeditions to ease the pressure from the Vendéen troops.

For the Vendéens, Cathelineau's wounding was a major event. His incapacitation is sometimes presented as a main cause of the assault's failure, but the means of communication at the time were such that only the fighters closest to him, at Viarme Square, knew very early on that he had been injured. Moreover, it was long claimed that he had been killed in action, which reinforced the idea that the commander's death had disorganized his troops. In reality, Cathelineau died from his wounds the following 14 July.

The search for a port that would allow the Vendéens to receive military aid from the Coalition could not be satisfied after the defeat at Nantes, and Vendée revolt experienced a lull. The Republicans took advantage of this time to send reinforcements, namely the Army of Mayence, to Nantes to relieve the city. The insurgents then began the Virée de Galerne, an operation that would prove fatal to the movement north of the Loire, which came to an end after their rout at the Battle of Savenay. The outcome of the Battle of Nantes was a determining factor in the defeat of the Vendéens.

The leadership of Nantes, including Baco and Beysser, had federalist sympathies and even considered marching on Paris. It was only after the Vendéen victories at Torfou and Montaigu, in September 1793, that Canclaux, Beysser and Baco were dismissed. Jean-Baptiste Carrier was placed at the head of the city; he initiated a policy of Terror targeting political opponents, particularly the Vendéens and priests, suspected of supporting the revolt.
