= Pierre-Mathurin Gillet =

French politician

Pierre-Mathurin Gillet (sometimes referred to as 'René Mathurin Gillet') (28 June 1762, Lanrelas, near Broons - 4 November 1795, Paris) was a French politician. Before the French Revolution he was a lawyer at Rochefort-en-Terre.

In 1790 the young Gillet was sent by the electors of Rochefort to the assembly of Pontivy and in May of the same year he was elected to a position in the administration of the newly created département of Morbihan. On 5 September 1791 Gillet was elected as an alternate deputy to the National Legislative Assembly but he was never called on to take a seat. Seven days later he was appointed procureur-général-syndic of Morbihan, making him, at 25, the highest-ranking local political figure.

On 9 September 1792 he was elected to the National Convention, coming sixth out of eight deputies elected. At just over 26 he was one of the youngest Convention members. He generally followed a moderate line, sitting with the Plain while having a number of Girondin acquaintances. During the trial of Louis XVI he voted against an appeal to the people and then in favour of the king's detention until peace was restored. However he refused to grant a reprieve on the death sentence once it was decided.

== Représentant en mission ==
Gillet was sent as a représentant en mission to the western départements in the Spring of 1793. He dismissed administrators and arrested judges. From Lorient he opposed the Insurrection of 31 May – 2 June 1793 but did not sign the protest petition, which saved him from arrest later. In June he was at Nantes with Merlin de Douai when the Vendéan rebels laid siege to the city. On 20 June the Vendean commanders, including Cathelineau offered to allow the Republican forces to withdraw with honour if they sent over the Convention deputies as hostages. Gillet and Merlin de Douai attempted to flee, but the citizens cut the reins of their carriages, forcing them to stay. After the siege was lifted, Gillet dismissed General Beysser, attacked Baco, the mayor of Nantes, and demanded the recall of Jean-Baptiste Carrier.

He accompanied the Republican armies in the Vendée, before being sent to the Army of the Moselle in 1794. There he denounced a conspiracy in the 17th demi-brigade and followed the army into Hainaut. On 8 Messidor Year II (26 June 1794) he was present at the battle of Fleurus. He was still on mission when Robespierre was overthrown, and quickly rallied behind the new government.

== After Thermidor ==
On 18 Germinal Year III (7 April 1795) he joined the Committee of Public Safety. Although his attendance was sporadic, he was in charge of military supplies. During the Revolt of 1 Prairial Year III he directed the led the forces that put down the uprising. He left the committee on 15 Messidor (3 July).

On 21 Vendémiaire Year IV (13 October 1795), Gillet was elected from Morbihan to the Council of Five Hundred. His term of office began on 4 Brumaire (26 October) but he never took his seat. He fell ill, exhausted after two years of work to support the Republic, and died on 13 Brumaire (4 November 1795) at the age of 33.
