= Jacques Cathelineau =

Insurrection leader during the French Revolution

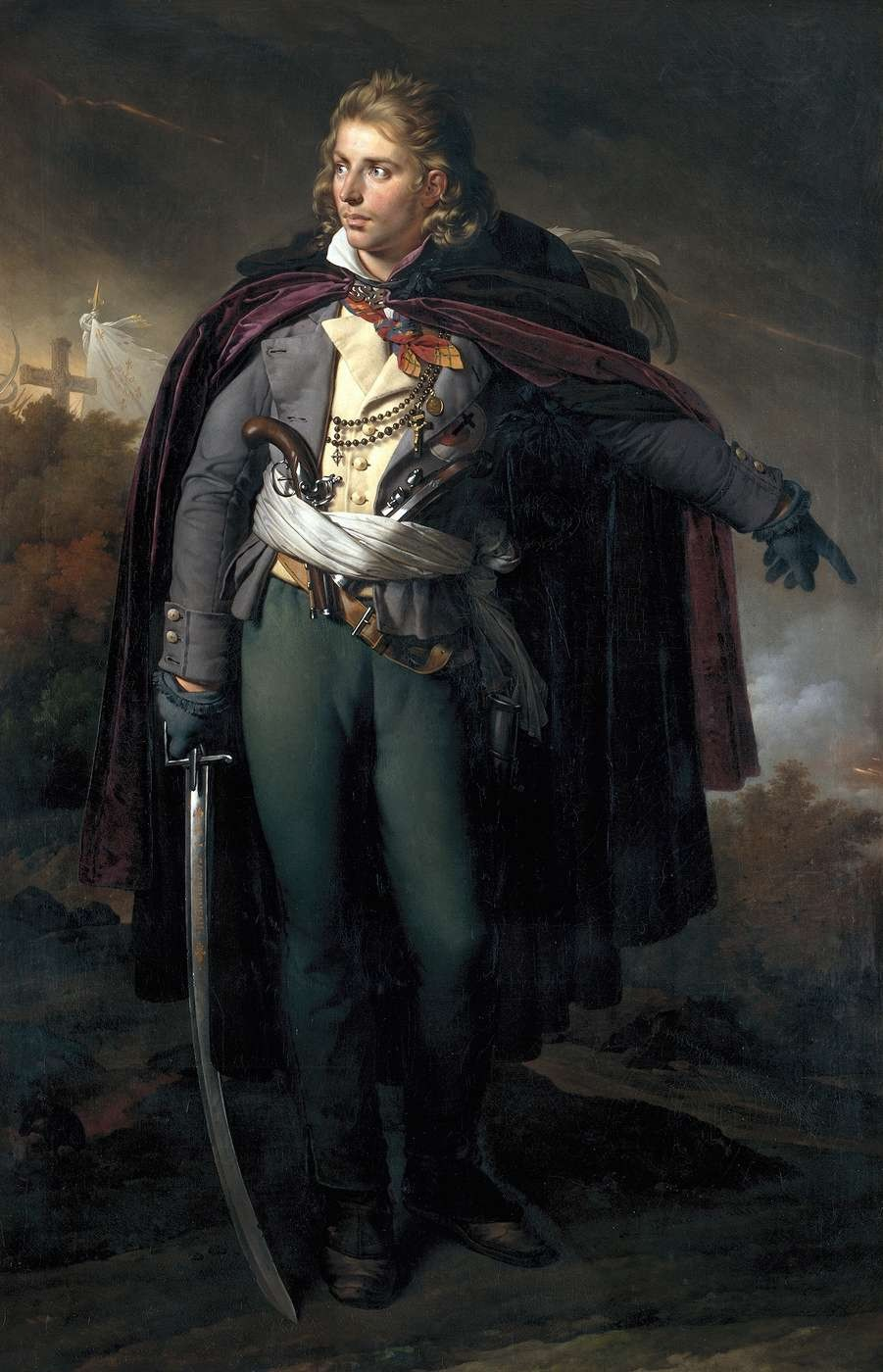
- Portrait of Jacques Cathelineau by Girodet, 1816
- Born: 5 January 1759; Le Pin-en-Mauges, Kingdom of France
- Died: 14 July 1793 (aged 34); Saint-Florent-le-Vieil, French First Republic
- Military career
- Allegiance: Kingdom of France
- Service years: 1793
- Rank: Generalissimo
- Nickname: the Saint of Anjou
- Commands: Catholic and Royal Army
- Conflicts: War in the Vendée; Battle of Thouars; First Battle of Fontenay-le-Comte; Battle of Saumur; Battle of Nantes

Jacques Cathelineau (French pronunciation: [ʒak katlino]; 5 January 1759 – 14 July 1793) was a French Vendéan insurrectionist leader during the Revolution. He was known among his followers as the Saint of Anjou.

He was a well known peddler in Anjou. When the Kingdom of France was abolished and the French First Republic was established, the revolutionaries committed atrocities against the civilians of the Vendée during the Reign of Terror. Cathelineau rallied an army of peasants loyal to the monarchy and the Church and waged an uprising against the revolutionaries, capturing several villages and castles, leading more volunteers to follow him.

As the War in the Vendée grew in success, Cathelineau joined forces with other counterrevolutionary leaders and was made generalissimo of the Catholic and Royal Army. He inspired his troops by fighting alongside them on the front lines, which proved to be his downfall. In the summer of 1793, while he and his men were storming the city of Nantes, Cathelineau was shot down by a sniper and died soon afterwards. Without his leadership the royalists were defeated and soon they broke up into different factions. After the Bourbon Restoration, in honour of the heroism and sacrifices of Cathelineau, his family were ennobled.

== Life ==
=== Early life ===
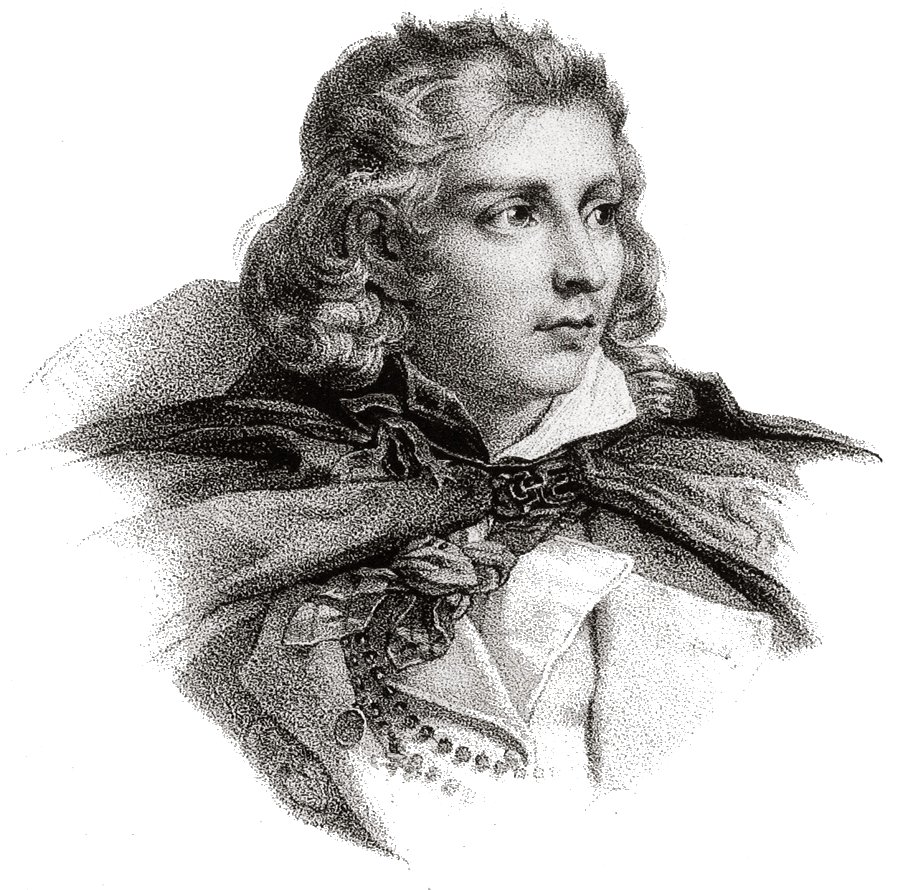
Engraving of Jacques Cathelineau

Born at Le Pin-en-Mauges, in the lands now forming the département of Maine-et-Loire, he became well known in Anjou, a region over which he travelled as a peddler and alleged dealer in contraband goods. He was a devout Catholic, and supported the Church's traditional role in French society. His great physical strength, charisma, and piety enabled him to command the respect of his fellow Vendeans.

In the first years of the Revolution, Cathelineau joined the numbers of Vendean peasants disgusted by the Civil Constitution of the Clergy, the draft laws, and the execution of King Louis XVI. He collected an army of peasants and waged a private war against the government of the French First Republic.

=== Rebellion ===
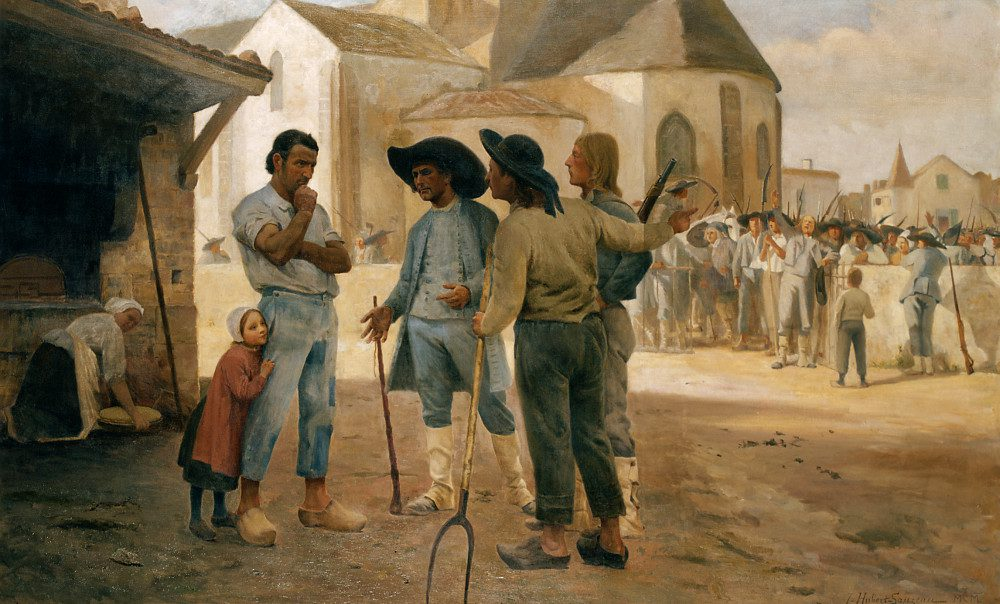
The Vendeans ask Cathelineau to lead the uprising, by Jules Gabriel Hubert-Sauzeau, 1900

As the war developed, the Vendeans became incensed by the massacres and atrocities committed by the revolutionaries on both Catholic clergy and their fellow Vendeans. On 10 March 1793, young people from the district of Saint-Florent-le-Vieil rebelled against the National Convention and beat and dispersed the local armed force. After learning of these events, Cathelineau left his cottage, gathered his neighbors, and convinced them that the only way to end the Reign of Terror was to openly take up arms and attack the Republicans. He took the initiative to gather all able-bodied men from his village to confront the Republicans. On 12 March, twenty-seven young men followed him, arming themselves in haste with any weapon they could find, and marched on Jallais, sounding the alarm and recruiting a crowd of peasants.

Arriving at Jallais on 13 March, defended by 80 Republicans and a cannon, he captured the château and seized the cannon— known to the Vendéans as "The Missionary". Soon the town Chemillé was also captured on 14 March, and many more volunteers came to reinforce the troops of Cathelineau. By 14 March he already had 3,000 men under arms, and with the help of Jean-Nicolas Stofflet marched on Cholet where he was again victorious. Afterwards they joined force with the other Vendéan leaders Charles de Bonchamps and Maurice d'Elbée. Cathelineau continued to have a huge influence on the peasants as the Royalists captured Vihiers and Chalonnes. The campaign was then interrupted, as insurgents returned home to celebrate Easter.

On 9 April his bands were again under arms, but he had to evacuate Chemillé and withdraw to Tiffauges. With 3,000 men, he joined Stofflet and took Cholet, Vihiers, and Chalonnes. He seized Beaupréau on 23 April and won the Battle of Thouars on 5 May. Having been pushed back to La Châtaigneraie on 14 May, the Vendéens were defeated in Fontenay-le-Comte by General Alexis Chalbos on 16 May. Cathelineau retaliated by defeating the Republicans at Montreuil-Bellay and Saumur on 9 June 1793.

After the Battle of Saumur and capture of the city, the insurgency had taken such a level of importance that the Royalist leaders thought it necessary to ensure the agreement of their operations and give command to one. Beloved by the troops, Cathelineau was proclaimed by Louis Marie de Lescure and Maurice d'Elbée as generalissimo of the Catholic and Royal Army by the assembled heads the Vendée on 12 June 1793. The peasants were further inspired by one of them being given army command.

=== Death ===
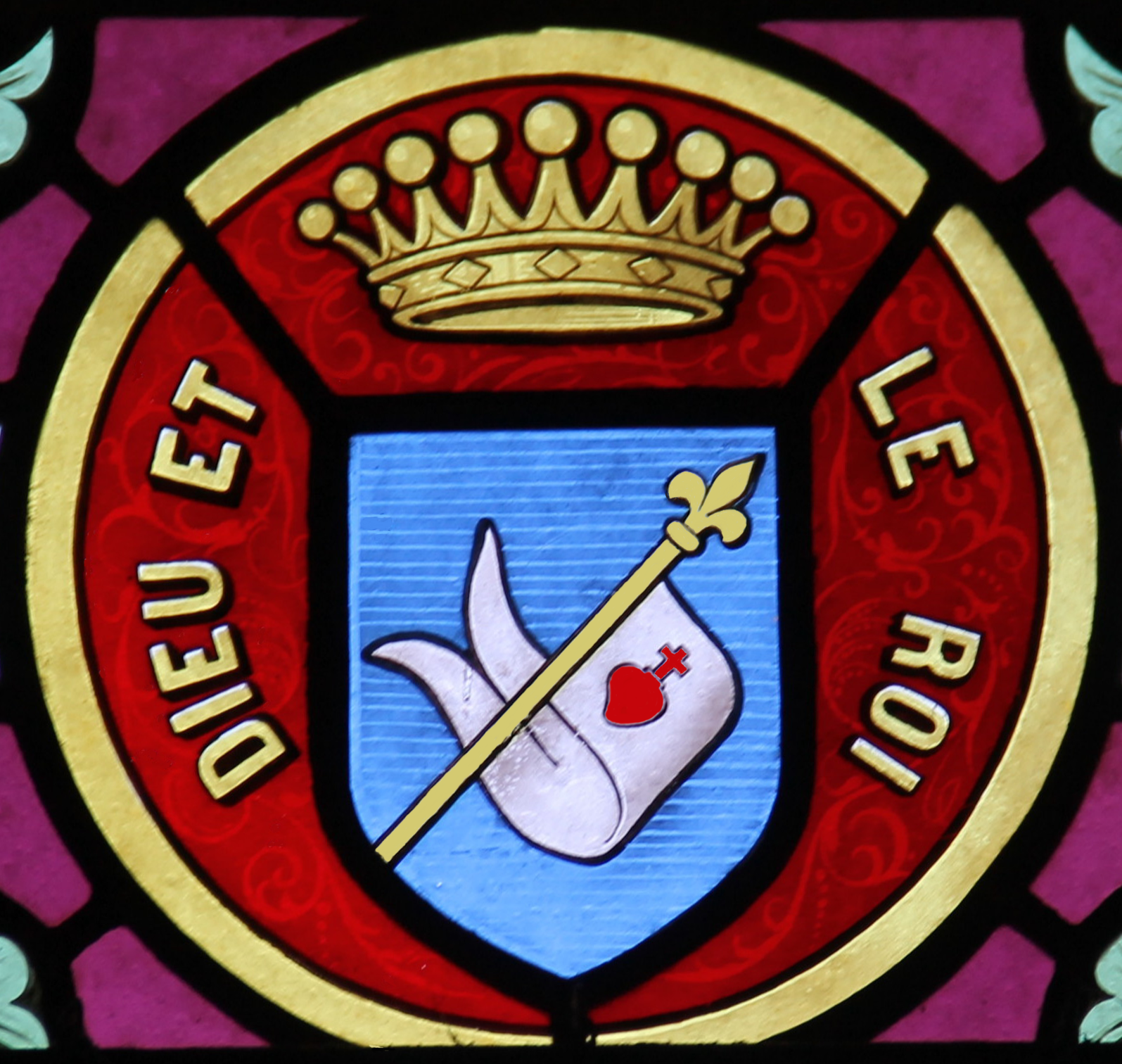
Arms of the Cathelineau family

After passing Angers on 23 June 1793 without difficulty, the combined Catholic and Royal Army led the storming of Nantes on 29 June. Cathelineau appeared before the city of Nantes at the head of 40,000 men, while Charette assisted him with 10,000 insurgents from Retz and Bas-Poitou. Cathelineau had entered the town in spite of the resistance of General Jean-Baptiste Canclaux and attacked the gate of Rennes. While penetrating Place Viarme, he was fatally wounded by a sniper from a window. With their leader incapacitated, the Vendéan army was defeated and soon divided into factions. He was transported to Saint-Florent-le-Vieil, where he died of his wounds on 14 July 1793. His body lies in the Cathelineau Chapel in Saint-Florent.

Numerous relatives of Cathelineau also perished in the war of Vendée and the reprisals that followed. The remainder of his family was ennobled under the Bourbon Restoration. His son Jacques-Joseph Cathelineau was knighted after the Restoration and his grandson Henry Cathelineau was an officer during the Franco-Prussian War.

== Canonization ==
Given the great piety and courage Cathelineau showed in defense of the Catholic faith, his beatification was proposed at the end of the 19th century. Documents of the diocesan process were lost in 1944 when an aerial bombardment destroyed the bishopric archives of Angers. He remains venerated as a holy man, even though he is not recognized as such by the Catholic Church.
