= Battle of Tiffauges =

1793 battle of the War in the Vendée

Coordinates: 47.0383°N 1.1147°W

Bataille de Torfou-Tiffauges
- Part of the War in the Vendée
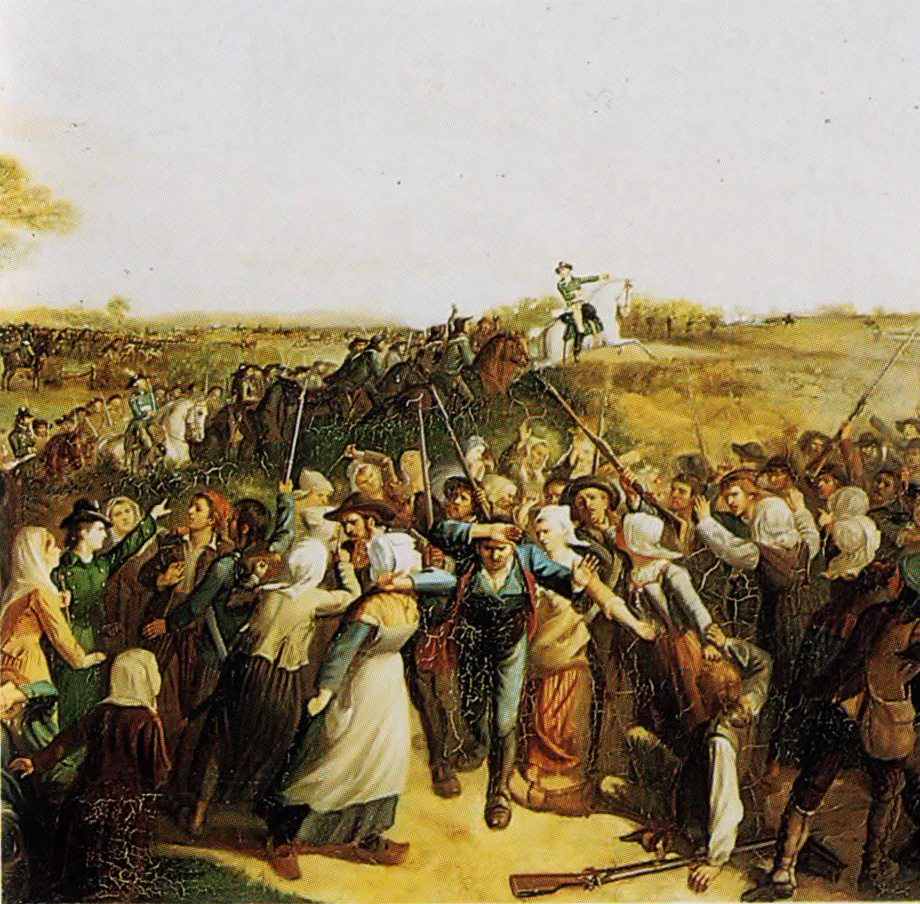
- Battle of Torfou: the women of Tiffauges block the path of the Vendéens fleeing at the sight of the troops from Mainz led by Kléber, painting by Alfred de Chasteignier.
Date	19 September 1793
Location	Near Tiffauges and Torfou
Result	Vendéen victory

Belligerents
(France) Republicans	(Kingdom of France) Vendéens

Commanders and leaders
Jean-Baptiste de Canclaux; Jean-Baptiste Kléber	Maurice d'Elbée; Charles de Bonchamps; Louis de Lescure; François de Charette

Strength
6,000 men	20,000 men

Casualties and losses
200 killed, 800 wounded	at least 200 killed

The battle of Torfou-Tiffauges was a battle on 19 September 1793 during the War in the Vendée. It pitted many Royalist military leaders against Republican troops under Jean-Baptiste Kléber and Canclaux.

== Course ==
15,000 men, detached as the Armée de Mayence from the Armée du Rhin after the fall of Mainz, were sent to reinforce Kléber's force. On 18 September, Charette and the Armée catholique et royale gathered again at Torfou, on the northern borders of Tiffauges.

Kléber led an advanced guard of 2,000 veterans against the 20,000-strong Royalist force. The following day, at 9 am, fire was exchanged for the first time. Kléber launched one battalion to the right of Torfou and one to its left, attempting to encircle the town. The Vendéens under Charette coming towards them were discovered, fired on and forced into retreat. However, the women in the rear blocked the fleeing troops and convinced them to regroup and fight on the plateau where the Republicans were advancing.

François Henri d'Elbée de La Sablonière entered the line and Bonchamps tried to outflank the Republican left. Engulfed in Royalist troops, Kléber advanced four cannons but was shot in the shoulder before realising his centre had collapsed. Kléber expected significant reinforcement but received only 4,000 additional men and was forced to withdraw. The republicans lost 200 killed and 800 wounded, the Royalists at least 200 killed.

== Consequences ==
The Royalists decided to profit from the victory by pursuing the enemy and attacked Montaigu, where general Beysser was defeated. On 2 September, the Royalist leaders decided they must support Bonchamps and his attack on Kléber. However, Charette and Lescure decided to march on Saint-Fulgent, where the Republican army had arrived. This disobedience had one immediate result – on his return to Montaigu, Charette learned that Kléber had escaped to Bonchamps. He grouped his army and returned to Legé.
