= Portrait of Jacques Cathelineau =

Painting by Anne-Louis Girodet de Roussy-Trioson

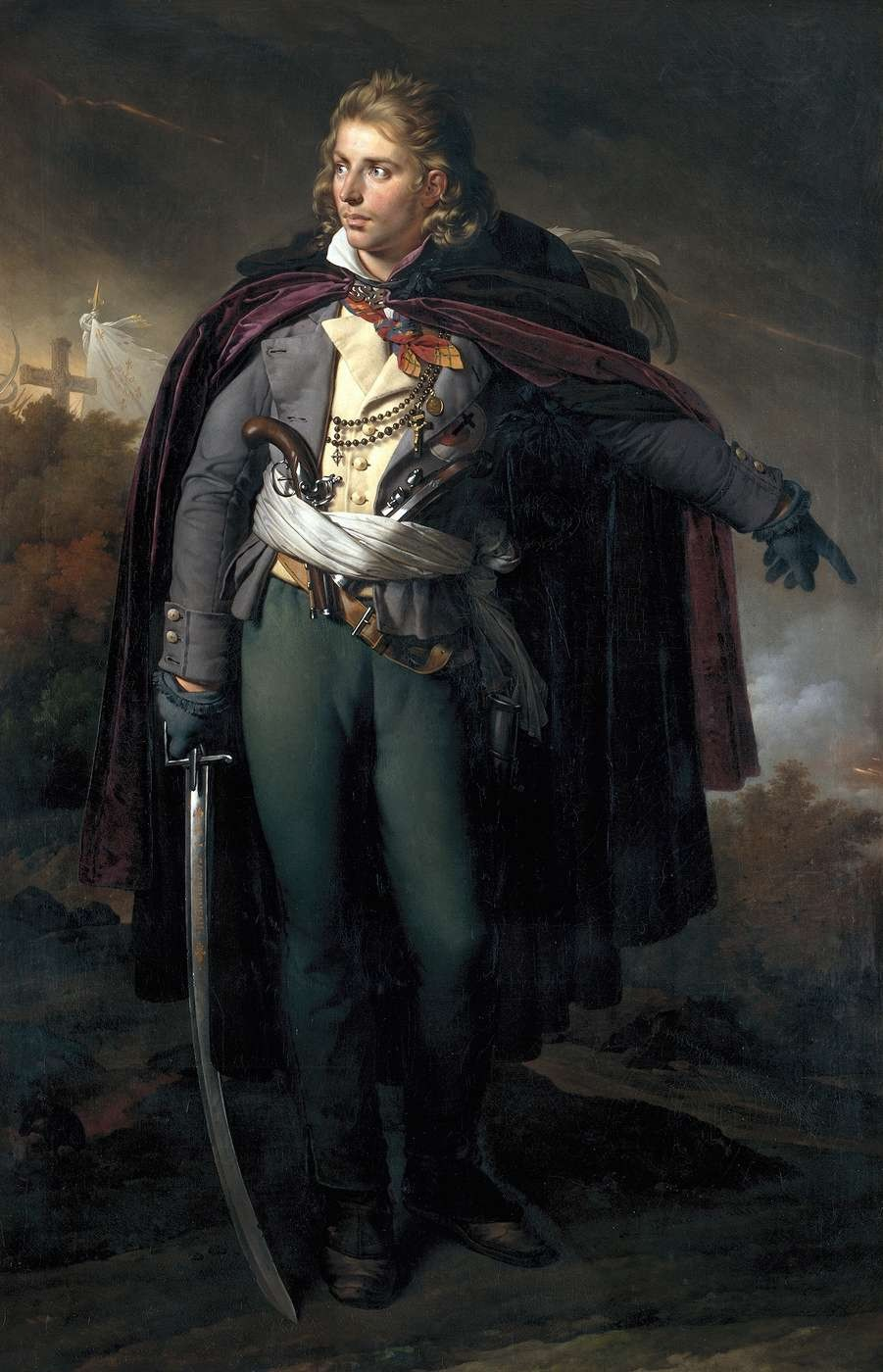
- Artist: Anne-Louis Girodet de Roussy-Trioson
- Year: c.1816
- Type: Oil on canvas, portrait painting
- Dimensions: 220 cm × 150 cm (87 in × 59 in)
- Location: Musée d'Art et d'Histoire de Cholet; Cholet

Portrait of Jacques Cathelineau is an 1816 oil painting by the French artist Girodet. Combining elements of history painting and portraiture it depicts Jacques Cathelineau one of the leaders of the War in the Vendée, a major but unsuccessful uprising against the French Revolution.

Cathelineau was a pedler and devout Roman Catholic who rose to major role in the insurgent Catholic and Royal Armies in Western France and died during the Battle of Nantes in 1792. He is depicted in the Romantic style that flourished during the Bourbon Restoration, in contrast to the dominant Neoclassicism of the Napoleonic era. Girodet used the Cathelineau son Jacques-Joseph as his model. Although noted for its expressive impact, the art critic William Hazlitt considered it made him look too foppish.

The painting was commissioned for 4,000 francs by Louis XVIII for the Château de Saint-Cloud. It was a part of a group of similar pictures commissioned by the French state to glorify the leaders of the Royalist risings against the French Revolution. The painting was displayed at the Salon of 1824 at the Louvre in Paris. Having previously been part of the collection of the Louvre it was transferred to the Palace of Versailles in 1870. Today it is on display at the Musée d'Art et d'Histoire de Cholet.

== See also ==
- Portrait of Henri de la Rochejaquelein, produced the same year by Pierre-Narcisse Guérin

== Bibliography ==
- Broers, Michael. Napoleon's Other War: Bandits, Rebels and Their Pursuers in the Age of Revolutions. Peter Lang, 2010.
- Oppenheimer, Margaret A. The French Portrait: Revolution to Restoration. Smith College Museum of Art, 2005.
