= Battle of Fontenay =

Battle of Fontenay may refer to:

- Battle of Fontenoy (841), during the Carolingian civil war
- Battle of Fontenay-le-Comte (1793), during the French Revolutionary Wars

== See also ==
- Battle of Fontenoy
