= Battle of Saumur (1793) =

1793 battle during the French Revolution

Coordinates: 47.2600°N 0.0769°W

- Part of the War in the Vendée
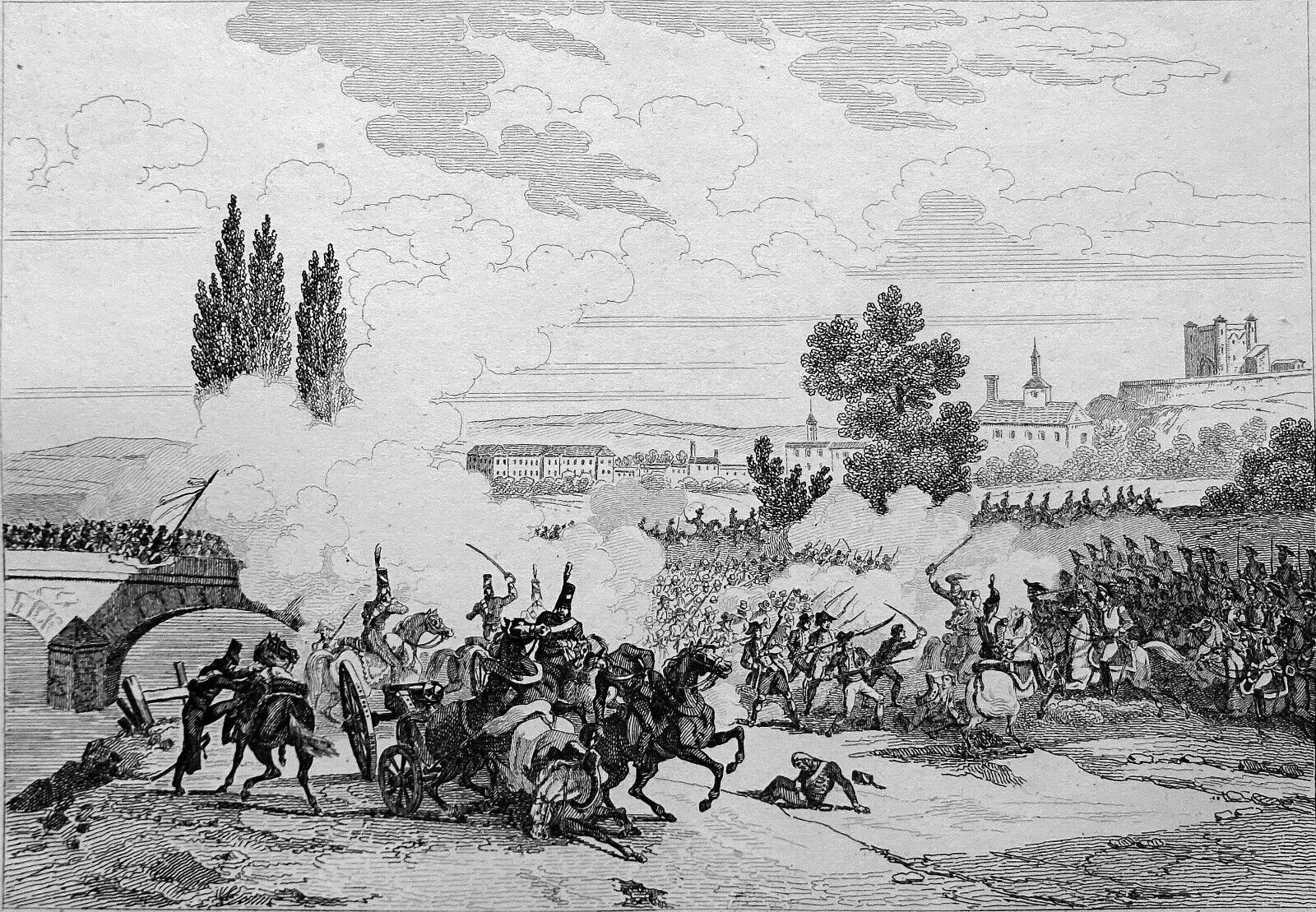
- Attack and capture of Saumur (French litography, c. 1835)
Date	11 June 1793
Location	Saumur, France
Result	Royalist victory

Belligerents
(France) French Republic	Vendeans

Commanders and leaders
Jacques-Francois Menou	Jacques Cathelineau

Strength
12,000	30,000

Casualties and losses
400–1,500 killed, 3,000 captured	100–400 killed

The Battle of Saumur took place during the Vendee Revolt. It occurred in the town of Saumur on 11 June 1793.

As at the battle of Thouars, the Republican prisoners were released after swearing not to fight again in the Vendée and having had their hair shaved off so they could be recognised lest they went back on their word and were recaptured. In the prison at Saumur, the Vendéens found general Pierre Quétineau who had been taken prisoner after his defeat at Thouars. General Lescure, knowing that his defeated opponent was under threat of a sentence of death from the revolutionary court, proposed to the republican general to remain among the royalists but not have to fight for them. Pierre Quétineau refused out of conviction, realising that even if he was safe the revolutionary court could instead punish his family if he was seen to be siding with the counter-revolutionaries, and returned to republican territory. There he was arrested and condemned to death for being defeated, as later was his wife.

Shortly after this battle, Cathelineau was elected generalisimo of the Catholic and Royal Army.

== Sources ==
- Johnson, Thomas George (1896). Francois-Severin Marceau (1769-1796). London: George Bell & Sons.
- Phipps, Ramsay Weston (2011). The Armies of the First French Republic: Volume III The Armies in the West 1793 to 1797 And, The Armies In The South 1793 to March 1796. Vol. 3. USA: Pickle Partners Publishing. ISBN 978-1-908692-26-9.
- Smith, Digby (1998). The Napoleonic Wars Data Book. London: Greenhill. ISBN 1-85367-276-9.
- Saumur jadis
