= Pierre Quétineau =

French general (1756–1794)

Pierre Quétineau (1756 – 17 March 1794) was a French general officer in the Army of the Coasts of La Rochelle during the War in the Vendée.

== Career ==
In command in the Vendée at the time of the War in the Vendée, he was attacked by superior forces at the town of Bressuire whose walls were in ruins and unable to hold off an assault; he retreated to Thouars. In the Battle of Thouars on 5 May 1793 the Vendean rebels captured the town and took him and his troops prisoner. He and his captured troops were released but when he reached Saumur he was arrested and thrown into prison. When the rebels also won the Battle of Saumur he fell into their hands again in June 1793. The Royalist generals asked him to join them, pointing out that the National Convention would not forgive his defeat. Nevertheless, Pierre Quétineau left to rejoin his army. He was judged by the Revolutionary Tribunal, condemned to death, and guillotined on 17 March 1794. His wife, Marie Anne Latreille appeared at the trial of Jacques Hébert and the Hébertists, and was also later guillotined in 1794.

== Legacy ==
There is a street named after him in Vrère to the east of Thouars.
