= Charles de Bonchamps =

French revolutionary (1760–1793)

Charles Artus de Bonchamps
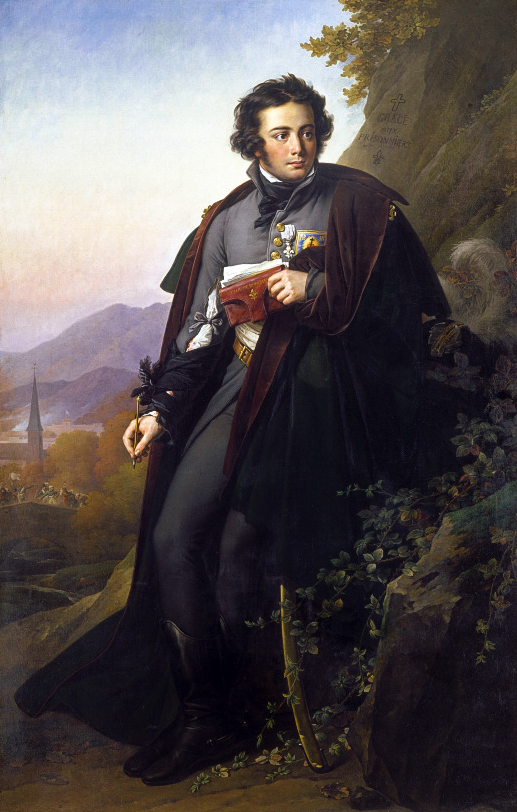
- Charles-Melchior Artus de Bonchamps, Marquis de Bonchamps, by Girodet (1816)
- Born: 10 May 1760; Juvardeil, Kingdom of France
- Died: 18 October 1793 (aged 33); Varades, French First Republic
- Military career
- Allegiance: Kingdom of France; Royalist rebels
- Branch: French Royal Army; Catholic and Royal Army
- Service years: 1777–1793
- Rank: General
- Conflicts: American Revolutionary War; War in the Vendée; Battle of Thouars; Battle of Fontenay-le-Comte; Battle of Nantes; First Battle of Châtillon; Battle of Tiffauges; Second Battle of Châtillon; Battle of La Tremblaye; Battle of Cholet †

Charles-Melchior Artus de Bonchamps, Marquis de Bonchamps (French pronunciation: [ʃaʁl mɛlkjɔʁ aʁtys də bɔ̃ʃɑ̃]; 10 May 1760 – 18 October 1793) was a French politician and leader of the Vendéan insurrection of Royalists against the Republic during the French Revolution.

Born at Juvardeil, Anjou, he gained his first military experience in the American War of Independence, and on his return to France was made a captain of grenadiers in the French royal army. He was a staunch defender of the French monarchy, and at the outbreak of the Revolution, resigned his command and retired to his château at Saint-Florent-le-Vieil. Shortly before the revolution broke out, Bonchamps feared for his king and country and requested to be reinstated. In the spring of 1793 he was chosen leader by the insurgents of the Vendée, and his directives were able to secure a large amount of supplies and weapons that would greatly aid the counterrevolution.

He was present at the taking of Bressuire, Thouars, and of Fontenay-le-Comte - where he was wounded but recovered. Dissensions among their leaders weakened the insurgents, and at the bloody battle of Cholet (October 1793) the Vendéans sustained a severe defeat and Bonchamps was mortally wounded. He died the next day.

His last act was the pardoning of five thousand Republican prisoners, whom his troops had sworn to kill in revenge for his death. Bonchamps was one of the best tactical leaders of the Vendéans and his death was an important victory for the republican forces. He was admired by the Christian monarchists and revolutionaries alike. A marble statue of him by Pierre Jean David stands in the church of Saint-Florent-le-Vieil. The plaster original of the statue is now in the Musée des Beaux-Arts de Bordeaux.
