= René-Gaston Baco de la Chapelle =

French politician

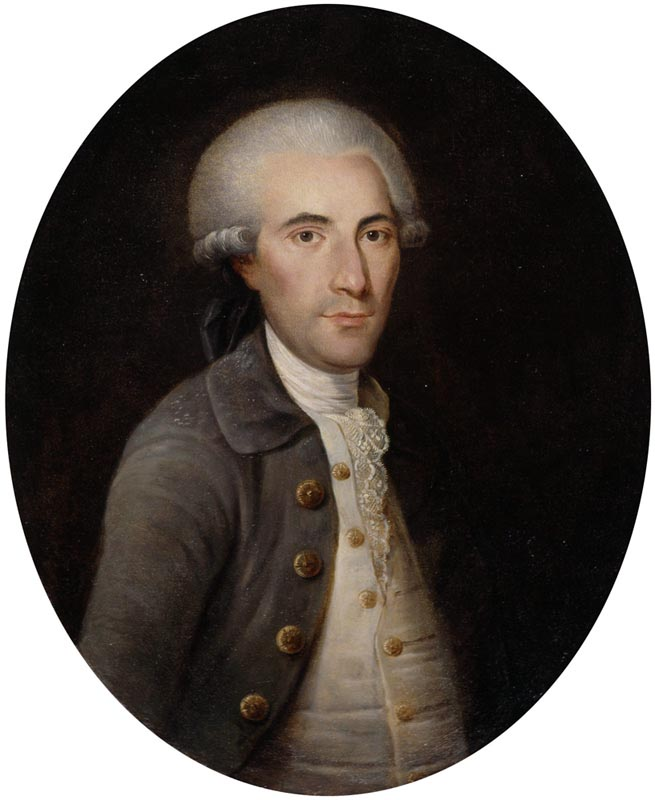
Anonymous portrait, c. 1793

René-Gaston Baco de La Chapelle (28 April 1751, Nantes – 29 November 1800, Guadeloupe) was a French lawyer and politician, deputy for Loire-Inférieure from 1789 to 1791 and mayor of Nantes in 1792–1793, notably during the Battle of Nantes in June 1793.

== Honours ==
- A marble bust of René-Gaston Baco de la Chapelle, made by Amédée Ménard, can be seen inside the Hôtel de Ville in Nantes.

== See also ==
- The French Revolution by Jules Michelet
- Pierre-Mathurin Gillet
- War in the Vendée
- Mayor of Nantes

== Bibliography ==
- Alexandre Perthuis and Stéphane de La Nicollière-Teijeiro, Le Livre doré de l’hôtel-de-ville de Nantes, Volume II, Imprimerie Grinsard, 1873, pages 32–35. (English:* Alexandre Perthuis and Stéphane de La Nicolliere-Teijeiro, The Golden Book of the City Hall of Nantes, Volume II, Imprimerie Grinsard, 1873, pages 32–35.)
