= Juvardeil =

- Commune
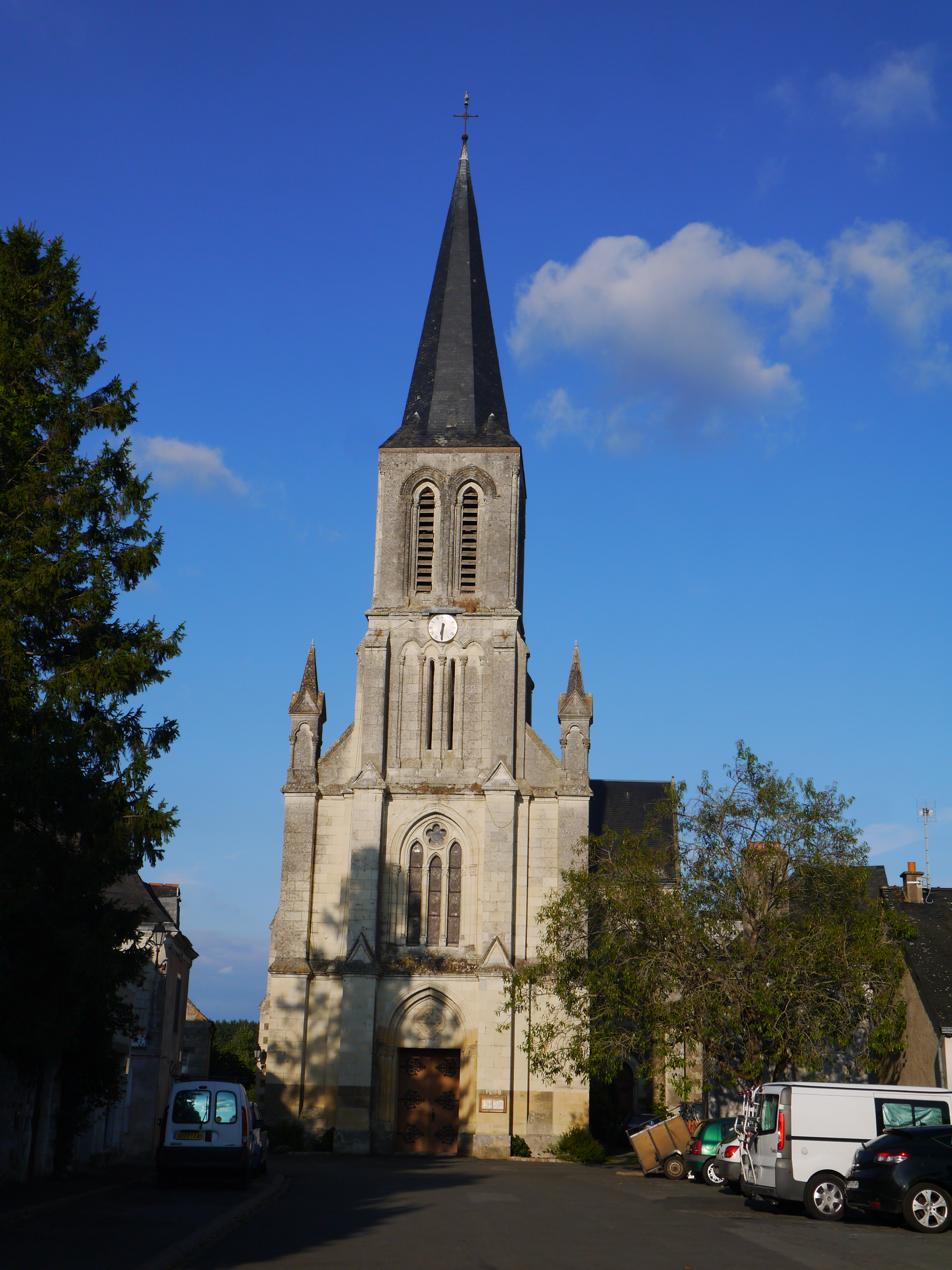
- The church in Juvardeil
- Location of Juvardeil
- Location within France Location within Pays de la Loire
- Coordinates: 47°39′21″N 0°29′50″W
- Country: France
- Region: Pays de la Loire
- Department: Maine-et-Loire
- Arrondissement: Segré
- Canton: Tiercé

Government
  - Mayor (2020–2026): Juanita Foucher
- Area^{1}: 18.95 km^{2} (7.32 sq mi)
- Elevation: 48 m (157 ft)
- Highest elevation: 77 m (253 ft)
- Lowest elevation: 16 m (52 ft)
- Population (2023): 833
  - Density: 44.0/km^{2} (114/sq mi)
- Demonym(s): Juvardeillais, Juvardeillaise
- Time zone: UTC+01:00 (CET)
  - Summer (DST): UTC+02:00 (CEST)
- INSEE/Postal code: 49170 /49330
- ^{1} French Land Register data, which excludes lakes, ponds, glaciers > 1 km^{2} (0.386 sq mi or 247 acres) and river estuaries.

Juvardeil (French pronunciation: [ʒyvaʁdɛj]) is a commune in the Maine-et-Loire department in western France.

== See also ==
- Communes of the Maine-et-Loire department
