= Battle of Fontenay-le-Comte =

1793 battle of the French Revolutionary Wars

Coordinates: 46.4661°N 0.8061°W

Battles of Fontenay-le-Comte
- Part of the War in the Vendée
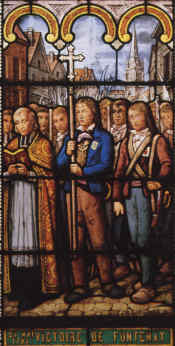
- Stained glass window in the Saint Pauvin Church in Le Pin-en-Mauges commemorating the battle(s).
Date	17 May 1793 and 25 May 1793
Location	Fontenay-le-Comte, Vendée, France
Result	Royalist victory

Belligerents
(France) French Republic	Vendeans

Commanders and leaders
Alexis Chalbos	Charles de Bonchamps; Marquis de Lescure

Strength
14,000	35,000

Casualties and losses
4,000, 40 cannons lost	1,000

The Battles of Fontenay-le-Comte were fought on 16 May 1793 and on 25 May 1793 during the French Revolutionary Wars, between forces of the French Republic under Alexis Chalbos and Royalist forces under Marquis de Lescure and Charles de Bonchamps. The battle was fought near the town of Fontenay-le-Comte in Vendée, France, and ended in a Royalist victory. The first battle resulted in the town's successful resistance to the insurgent army; the second battle resulted in the Vendean victory.

== Background ==
In 1791, two representatives on mission informed the National Convention of the disquieting condition of Vendée, and this news was quickly followed by the exposure of a royalist plot organized by the Marquis de la Rouërie. It was not until the social unrest combined with the external pressures from the Civil Constitution of the Clergy (1790) and the introduction of a levy of 300,000 on the whole of France, decreed by the National Convention in February 1793, that the region erupted.

The Civil Constitution of the Clergy required all clerics to swear allegiance to it and, by extension, to the increasingly anti-clerical National Constituent Assembly. All but seven of the 160 French bishops refused the oath, as did about half of the parish priests. Persecution of the clergy and of the faithful was the first trigger of the rebellion. Nonjuring priests had been exiled or imprisoned. Women on their way to Mass were beaten in the streets. Religious orders had been suppressed and Church property, confiscated. On 3 March 1793, virtually all the churches were ordered closed. Soldiers confiscated sacramental vessels and the people were forbidden to place crosses on graves.

Nearly all the purchasers of church land were bourgeois; very few peasants benefited from the sales. To add to this insult, on 23 February 1793 the Convention required the raising of an additional 300,000 troops from the provinces, an act which enraged the populace, who took up arms instead as "The Catholic Army"; the term "Royal" was added later. This army fought first and foremost for the reopening of parish churches with the former priests.

In March 1793, as word of the conscription requirements filtered into the countryside, many Vendéans refused to satisfy the decree of the levee en masse issued on 23 February 1793. Within weeks the rebel forces had formed a substantial, if ill-equipped, army, the Royal and Catholic Army, supported by two thousand irregular cavalry and a few captured artillery pieces. Most of the insurgents operated on a much smaller scale, using guerrilla tactics, supported by the unparalleled local knowledge and the good-will of the people.

== Initial attack ==
On 16 June, Vendéen troops attacked the town, and were successfully held off by the small Republican force garrisoned there. D'Elbee was wounded, 200 men were taken prisoner, guns, rifles and baggage were lost, including a favorite cannon of the insurgents, which they had christened Marie-Jeanne. Commander Sandoz wrote to the government in Paris, assuring them that the peasants were routed. A proclamation, addressed to the insurgents, appealed to their revolutionary nature, but without success.

After the battle, the Vendean army melted away, as if, one chronicler wrote, "into thin air." Yet, within days, as many as 35,000 men gathered at Chatillon, and moved toward Fontenay. Under the command of Charles de Bonchamps, they withstood an hour-long cannonade and sustained musketry fire; not until Louis Marie de Lescure advanced to the head of his column did the insurgent army move forward. Reportedly, Lescure, who had given his men the command to attack, saw them waver and hang back. Alone he advanced, waved his hat, and shouted (reportedly) Vive le Roi! (Long live the king!) The Republicans showered him with bullets, but he was unwounded. Turning, he shouted to his men, "The Blues (republicans) do not know how to shoot." The insurgents rushed forward and took the city. The general advance of the insurgents, who had little ammunition and few weapons, caused disorder among the Republican troops; they fled. The insurgents recaptured their cannon, a symbol of their unity, and acquired, in the process, stores of grain and weapons.

=== Massacres ===
The battle was not without its controversy. Upon entering the city, the insurgents found streets full of republicans in full panic. One of them pleaded for his life from Bonchamps, and it was granted, upon which the man shot Bonchamps. Dangerously wounded, Bonchamps instructed Lescure to secure the safety of the royalists already imprisoned there; while Lescure was away, Bonchamps' own men killed the man who had shot their general, and then killed all his companions too, some 60 Republicans.

== See also ==
- Revolt in the Vendée
