= Battle of Thouars =

1793 battle

Coordinates: 46.9758°N 0.2142°W

- Part of the War in the Vendée
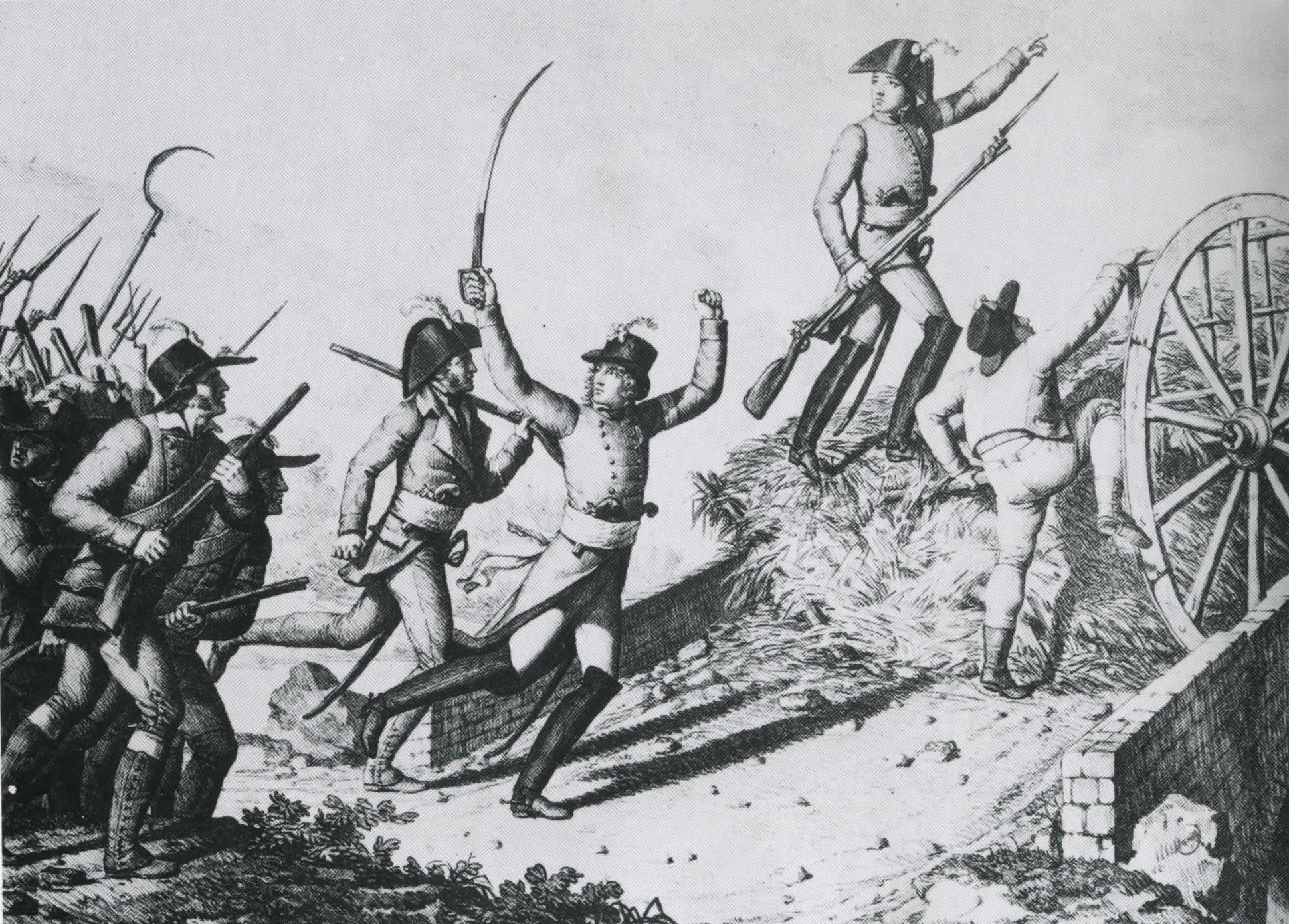
- Henri de La Rochejacquelein and the Marquis de Lescure leading troops on the pont de Vrine
Date	5 May 1793
Location	Thouars, Deux-Sèvres, France
Result	Royalist victory

Belligerents
(Kingdom of France) Vendean Royalists	(France) French Republic

Commanders and leaders
(Kingdom of France) Marquis de Lescure (Kingdom of France) Charles Bonchamps (Kingdom of France) Henri de La Rochejaquelein	(France) Pierre Quétineau

Units involved
(Kingdom of France) Catholic and Royal Army	(France) Army of the Coasts of La Rochelle

Strength
20,000	5,000

Casualties and losses
200 killed	600 killed, 3,000 captured

> (France) 600 killed, 3,000 captured

The Battle of Thouars (5 May 1793) was a battle between Royalist and Republican French forces during the War in the Vendée. The Royalists or Vendeans led by Louis Marie de Lescure, Charles de Bonchamps, and Henri de La Rochejaquelein seized the town of Thouars and compelled its Republican defenders under Pierre Quétineau to surrender.

== Battle ==
To defend the city, the Republicans had been posted on the bridges of the River Thouet in front of the city. The main clash took place on the pont de Vrine. The Vendéens proved unable to take the bridge for six hours, until Louis Marie de Lescure (fighting in his first battle) showed himself alone on the bridge under enemy fire and encouraged his men to follow him, which they did, crossing the bridge. The Republicans there were taken from behind by the cavalry under Charles de Bonchamps, which had crossed the river at a ford. Despite the arrival of reinforcements, the Republicans were turned to rout and withdrew towards the city. The Whites, headed by Henri de La Rochejacquelein, took the rampart by force and poured into the city, and the Republican troops quickly capitulated. The Vendéens seized a large amount of arms and gunpowder, but allowed the captured Republican forces to leave, after having sworn to no longer fight in the Vendée and had their hair shaved off so they could be recognised lest they went back on their word and were recaptured.
