= Battle of Montaigu =

Coordinates: 46.9736°N 1.3086°W

- Part of the War in the Vendée
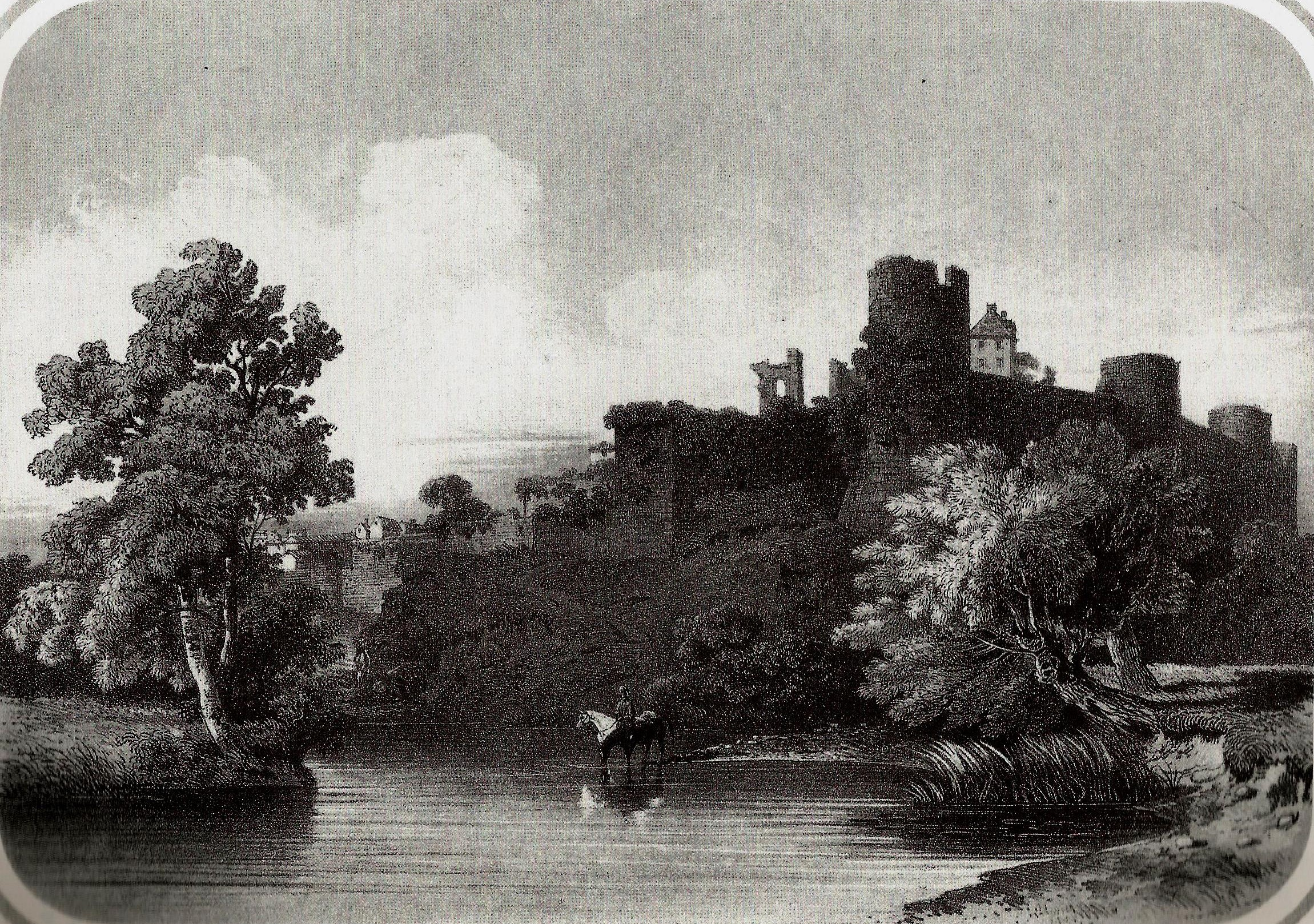
- View on Montaigu by Thomas Drake (1818-1895)
Date	21 September 1793
Location	Montaigu, Vendée
Result	Vendean victory

Belligerents
(Kingdom of France) French Royalists	Republican France

Commanders and leaders
(Kingdom of France) Louis de Lescure (Kingdom of France) François de Charette (Kingdom of France) Jean-Baptiste Joly (Kingdom of France) Jean Savin	(France) Jean-Michel Beysser (France) Jean-Baptiste Cavaignac

Units involved
(Kingdom of France) Catholic and Royal Army	(France) Army of the Coasts of La Rochelle

Strength
20,000	7,000

Casualties and losses
?	400 to 2,000 men 14 cannons

The Battle of Montaigu was a battle on 21 September 1793 during the War in the Vendée, in which the Vendéens were victorious.

== The Battle ==
The Vendéens attacked general Jean-Michel Beysser's French Republican division. Taken by surprise, this division fought back but lost 400 men, including many captured. Some of these prisoners were summarily executed by the Vendeens and their bodies later found in the castle wells by troops under Jean-Baptiste Kléber.

Following this battle Beysser was recalled to Paris, compromised by his Girondin past, condemned to death with the Hébertists, and guillotined on 13 April 1794.

== Sources ==
- Yves Gras, La Guerre de Vendée, éditions Economica, 1994, p. 75.
