= Jean-Michel Beysser =

French military general

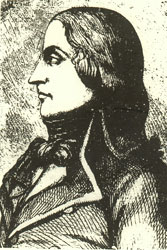
- Born: 4 November 1753; Ribeauvillé
- Died: 13 April 1794 (aged 40) Paris
- Allegiance: Kingdom of France; Kingdom of the French; French First Republic
- Branch: Army
- Service years: 1769–1794
- Rank: Général de brigade
- Conflicts: French Revolutionary Wars; War in the Vendée; Battle of Nantes; Battle of Montaigu; Chouannerie

Jean-Michel Beysser (4 November 1753, in Ribeauvillé – 13 April 1794, in Paris) was a French general.

== Life ==
=== Before 1789 ===
He began his military career as a dragoon in the régiment de Lorraine from 1769 to 1778. He was later part of the armée de Bretagne from 1778 to 1781, apparently as a surgeon-major. He served in the Swiss régiment de Meuron as a surgeon-major under the orders of the Dutch East India Company, then as the captain of a Dutch regiment, before returning to France in 1788.

=== Revolution ===
In July 1789, he was made major of the National Guard dragoons at Lorient, rising to lieutenant colonel in 1790 then a captain in the National Gendarmerie of Morbihan in 1791. Thanks to the French Revolutionary Wars he rose rapidly through the officer ranks:

- 10 February 1793, adjudant-général as supernumerary lieutenant-colonel without appointments, to the armée des Côtes.
- 7 March 1793, chef de brigade to the 21e chasseurs à cheval.
- 6 May 1793, adjudant-général chef de brigade to the armée des Côtes-de-Brest
- 20 June 1793, général de brigade.

In this last post he repulsed the Vendéens at the end of June 1793. Signing the federalist manifesto of 5 July 1793, he was forced to take refuge in Lorient. On 2 August 1793 he defended himself before the National Convention, which restored him to the same army and the same rank as before. On 17 September 1793, he was defeated by the Vendéens at Montaigu. Already suspecting him, the government arrested him and on 2 October 1793 imprisoned him in the Prison de l'Abbaye. He appeared before the Revolutionary Tribunal of Paris and was condemned to death by it on 24 March 1794 (4 germinal year II), as an accomplice of Jacques-René Hébert, Charles-Philippe Ronsin, François-Nicolas Vincent, Mazuel, Antoine-François Momoro (all already condemned) in trying to dissolve the national representative assembly and put a tyrant in place over the state. He was guillotined at the same time as Arthur de Dillon, Pierre Gaspard Chaumette, Jean-Baptiste Gobel, Lucile Desmoulins and Marie Marguerite Françoise Hébert on 13 April 1794 (24 germinal an II).

== Sources ==
- Jean Tulard, Jean-François Fayard et Alfred Fierro, Histoire et dictionnaire de la Révolution française. 1789–1799, Robert Laffont, coll. "Bouquins", Paris, 1987
