= Louis Marie de Lescure =

French royalist military officer (1766–1793)

Louis Marie de Salgues de Lescure
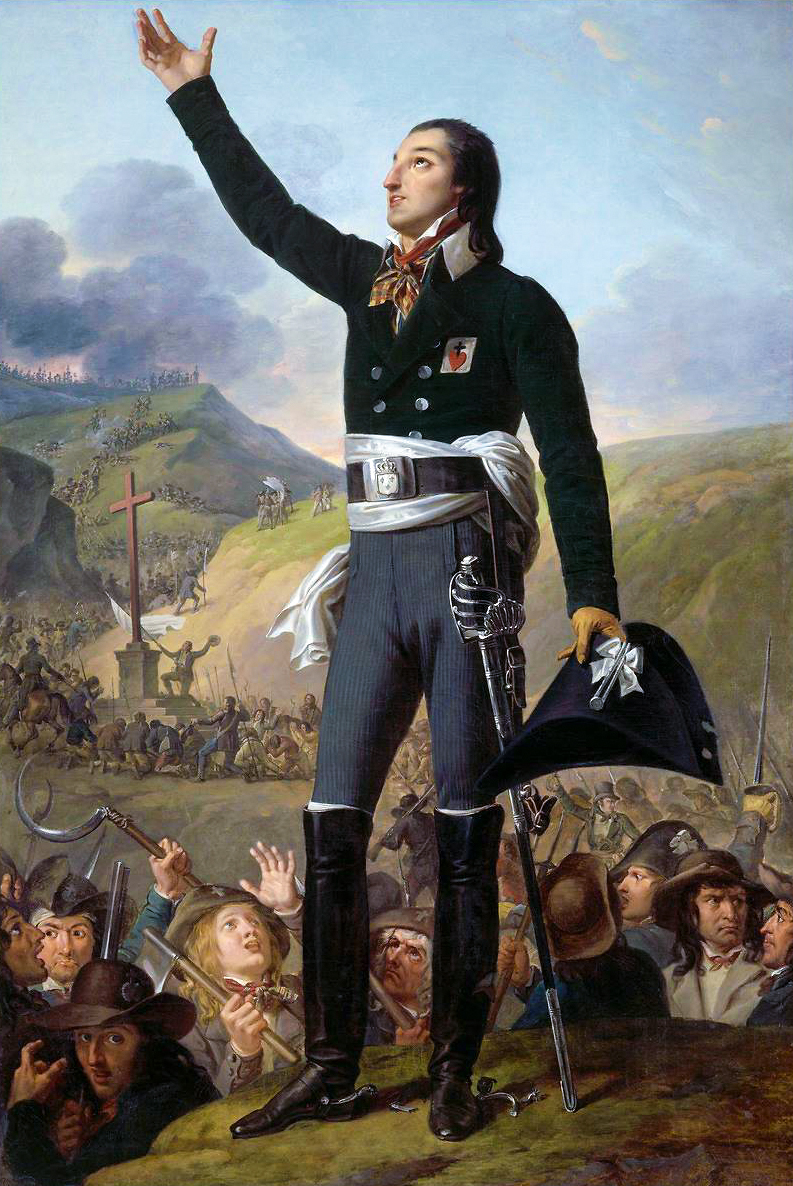
- Portrait by Robert Lefèvre, 1818
- Born: 13 October 1766; Versailles, Kingdom of France
- Died: 4 November 1793 (aged 27); La Pellerine, French First Republic
- Spouse: Victoire de Donnissan de La Rochejaquelein
- Relatives: Henri de La Rochejaquelein (cousin)
- Military career
- Allegiance: Kingdom of France; Royalist rebels
- Branch: French Royal Army
- Service years: 1782–1793
- Rank: Général
- Nickname: Le saint du Poitou
- Conflicts: Insurrection of 10 August 1792; War in the Vendée; Battle of Thouars; Battles of Fontenay-le-Comte; Battle of Saumur; First Battle of Châtillon; Battle of Luçon; Battle of Tiffauges; Battle of Montaigu; Battle of Saint-Fulgent; Second Battle of Châtillon; Battle of La Tremblaye (WIA); Virée de Galerne †

Louis Marie de Salgues, marquis de Lescure (13 October 1766 – 4 November 1793) was a French soldier and opponent of the French Revolution, the cousin of Henri de la Rochejaquelein.

== Biography ==
=== Early life ===
He was born in Versailles and educated at the École Militaire, which he left at the age of sixteen. Lescure was in command of a company of cavalry in the Regiment de Royal-Piémont. In 1791, he married his cousin Victoire de Donnissan de La Rochejaquelein, who was also the cousin of Henri de la Rochejaquelein, another royalist rebel of Vendée. Being opposed to the ideas of the Revolution, he emigrated in 1791, but soon returned, and, on the Insurrection of 10 August 1792, took part in the defence of the Tuileries Palace against the mob of Paris. The day after, he was forced to leave the capital, and took refuge in the château of Clisson near Bressuire.

=== War in the Vendée ===
On the outbreak of the Revolt in the Vendée against the Republic, he was arrested and imprisoned with all his family, as one of the promoters of the rising. He was set free by the Royalists and became one of their leaders. Lescure fought at Thouars in May 1793. At the Battle of Fontenay-le-Comte, he was the first to enter the city and free the Royalist prisoners inside. He was wounded at the Battle of Saumur in June. After an unsuccessful attack on Nantes, he joined forces with La Rochejaquelein and tried in vain to rally the troops of the dispersed Catholic and Royal Army.

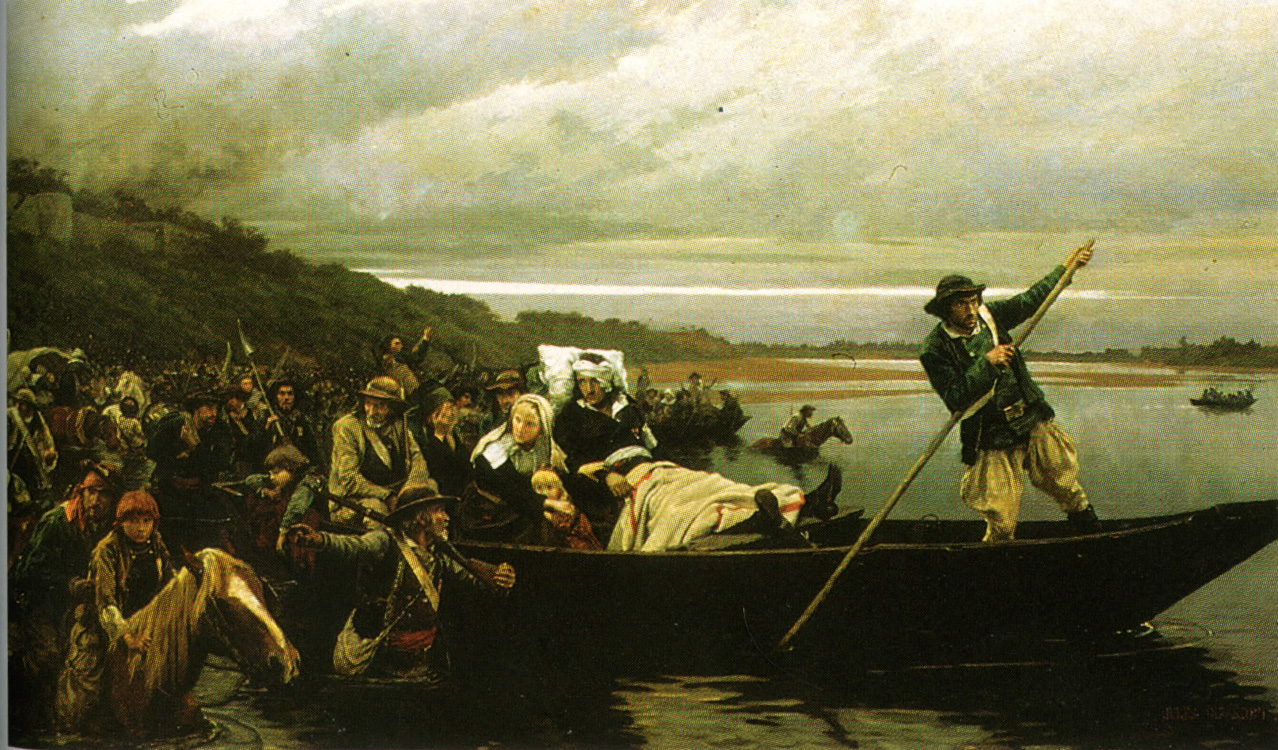
The wounded General Lescure crosses the Loire at St. Florent, by Jules Girardet

Their peasant troops, opposed to the French Revolutionary Army General François Joseph Westermann, sustained multiple defeats, but finally gained a victory between Tiffauges and Cholet on 19 September 1793. He was seriously wounded by a bullet to the head at Tiffauges. The struggle was then concentrated around Châtillon, which was time after time taken and lost by the Republicans. Lescure was killed near the château of La Tremblaye at the Battle of La Tremblaye, between Ernée and Fougères.
