= Catholic and Royal Armies =

Royalist insurgencies during the French Revolution

Catholic and Royal Army of Vendée
- Type of Catholic and Royal Army of Vendée flag
- Active: 1793–1796; 1799–1800; 1815; 1832
- Country: France; Poitou, Anjou, Brittany: Vendée, northern Deux-Sèvres, southern Maine-et-Loire, southern Loire-Atlantique
- Allegiance: Kingdom of France
- Type: Army
- Role: Ground warfare
- Size: 80,000 men
- Mottos: Pour Dieu et le Roi (For God and the King)
- Colors: White cockade
- Engagements: War in the Vendée

Commanders
- Notable commanders: • Jacques Cathelineau • Maurice d'Elbée • Henri de La Rochejaquelein • François de Charette • Jean-Nicolas Stofflet

Insignia

The Catholic and Royal Armies (French: Armées catholiques et royales) is the name given to the royalist armies in western France composed of insurgents during the War in the Vendée and the Chouannerie, who opposed the French Revolution, and later both the French Empire and the July Monarchy.

== Catholic and Royal Army of Vendée ==
The Catholic and Royal Army of Vendée was composed of the three Vendéen armies although that of lower Poitou joined only occasionally.

During the year 1793, the Vendéen army was distinguished into sub-armies: The army of Charette in the Marais breton, the Catholic and Royal Army of Anjou and Haut-Poitou, and that of Bas-Poitou and Retz country, south of the Loire. The Chouans of the north of the Loire who joined the Vendéens during the Virée de Galerne were named Catholic and Royal Army of Bas-Anjou and of Haute-Bretagne.

In reality, those armies were simply groups of fluctuating insurgents led by a chief who had authority over people following his beliefs. The only units with a quasi-permanent existence and organization are the "compagnies de paroisse" which grouped together members of the rural community who elected their captains. Although two-thirds of the insurgents were peasants, they only represented half of the men in these units, the rest being artisans and shopkeepers.

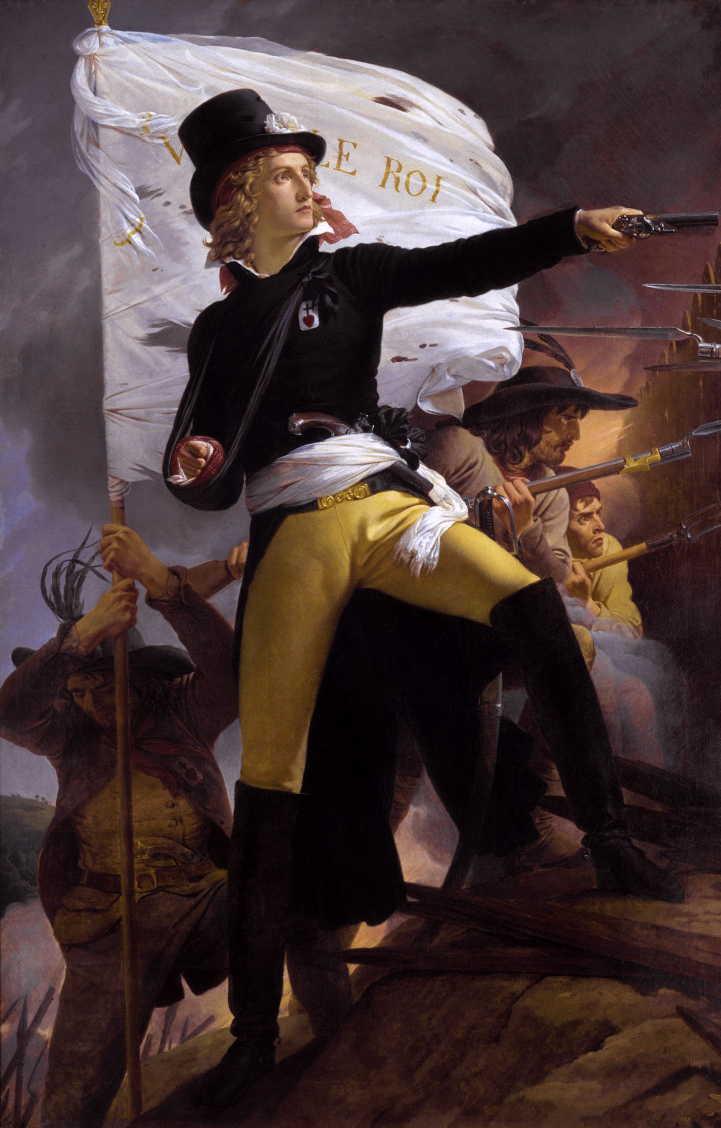
Portrait of Henri de la Rochejaquelein by Pierre-Narcisse Guérin, 1816

The flaws of this army were its few health services and its lack of permanent fighters, even considering their reinforcements of republican deserters, gabelous, Germans or Swiss. Their weaponry and provisions were also poor. The cavalry was only composed of noble chiefs, a few game wardens and peasants mounted on farm horses. The artillery was composed only of old culverin taken from castles and a few cannons taken from the republicans, making it impossible for the Catholic and Royal Army to oppose a strong Republican army on open field, or to break the fortifications of a town like at Granville.

After the Battle of Savenay, the army was reconstructed on paper but its actual existence was insignificant; the insurrection became a chouannerie.

=== Peasant soldiers ===
The royalist insurgents who take the name of Vendéens, and that the Republicans named Brigands, originated from four departments, southern Maine-et-Loire, northern Vendée, northern Deux-Sèvres, et southern Loire-Atlantique in the provinces of Poitou, Anjou and Brittany. The insurgent territory took the name of military Vendée.

The great majority of Vendéen insurgents were peasants, armed with scythes if they did not have rifles, but there were also a great number of artisans, especially in the Mauges region of Anjou.

The mobilisation in the insurgent territories was massive. In Chemillé, the age of the insurgents varied from 11 to 67 years old. The typical age was 25 to 30 years old.

A few women also fought among the Vendéens; the most famous one was Renée Bordereau. The army of Charette was known to have a few amazons in its ranks, including Céleste Bulkeley.

It was only during the Virée de Galerne that the officers started adopting signs to distinguish themselves from the troops. The generals and officers of the counsel took white scarves worn at the belt with knots of different colors. La Rochejaquelein and Donnissan wore a black knot, Stofflet a red one, and Marigny a blue one. Officers of a lower rank started wearing a white scarf attached to their left arm.

Priests who opposed the revolution did not have a direct role in the war; a few held a seat in the royalist counsels and mainly took care of correspondences. For a priest to serve as an officer or to physically participate in combat was generally not well considered by Vendéens.

=== Regular army ===
A few regular troops were formed in the army of Vendée, where they served as elite troops. Charles de Bonchamps organized infantry and cavalry units whom he equipped with his own means. These troops were even given uniforms, grey for the infantry, green for the cavalry.

Nonetheless, the Vendéens did not like leaving their homes for too long, so after a few days of combat they would leave the army and go back to their villages. Hence the Vendéens were incapable of keeping conquered towns like Angers, Saumur, Thouars and Fontenay-le-Comte, which were progressively abandoned and retaken by the republicans without difficulty.

To fix this disadvantage, regular troops were recruited among republican deserters and insurgents exterior to Vendée, especially Angevins from northern Maine-et-Loire and Bretons from the Loire-Atlantique. A few future Chouan officers served with these troops, including Georges Cadoudal, Pierre-Mathurin Mercier, Scépeaux, Jean Terrien, Joseph-Juste Coquereau and Louis Courtillé.

Regular cen troops also included a high number of foreigners, including Russians, Germans and many Jews (according to republican Jacques Léonard Laplanche's writings).

Among the foreign soldiers who joined the Vendéens are included the Germans of the Régiment de La Mark and of the Germanic Legion, as well as a battalion of 600 Swiss and Germans commanded by the baron of Keller, of which some were former Swiss Guards.

=== Generals of the Vendée ===
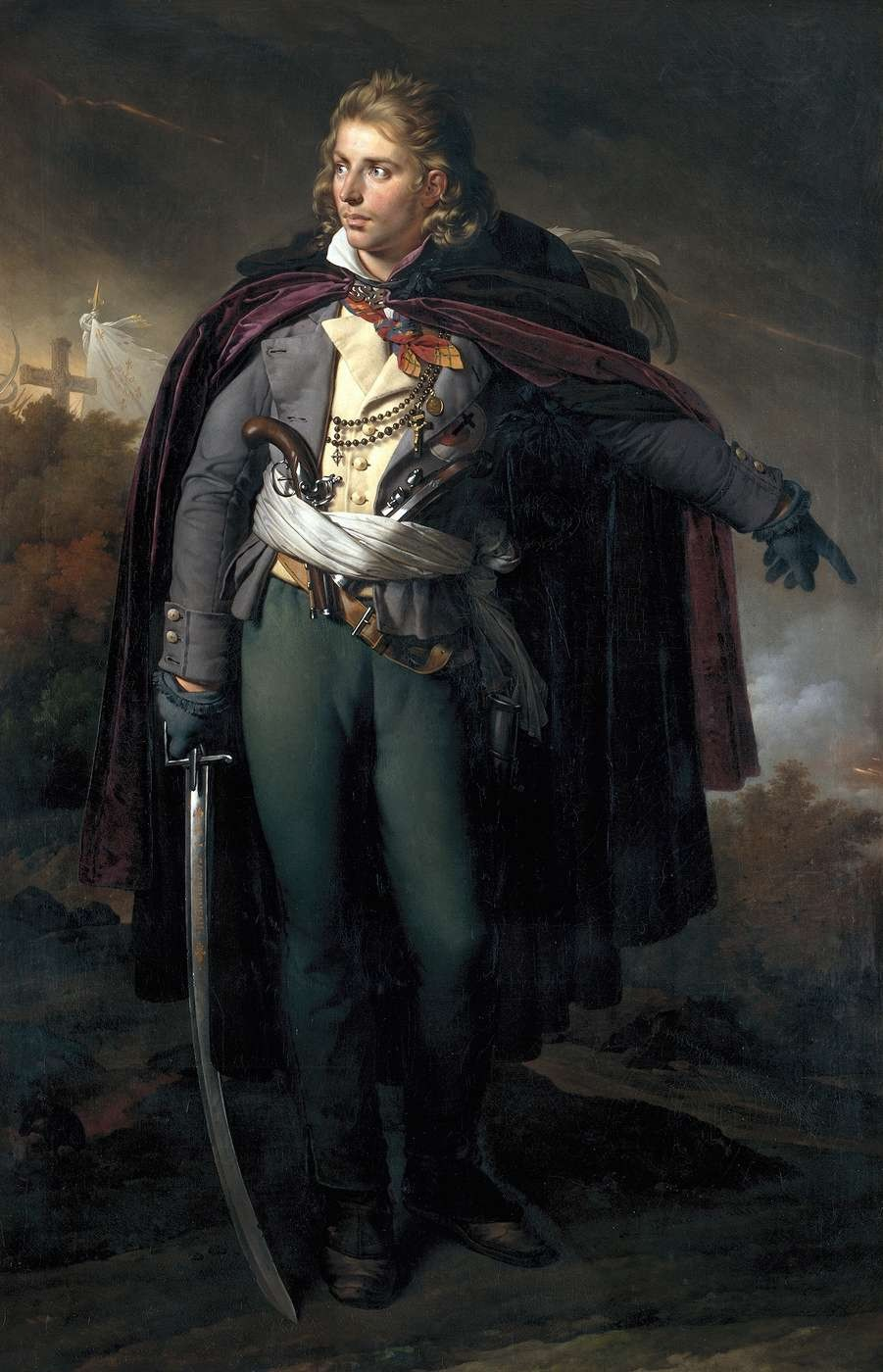
Jacques Cathelineau

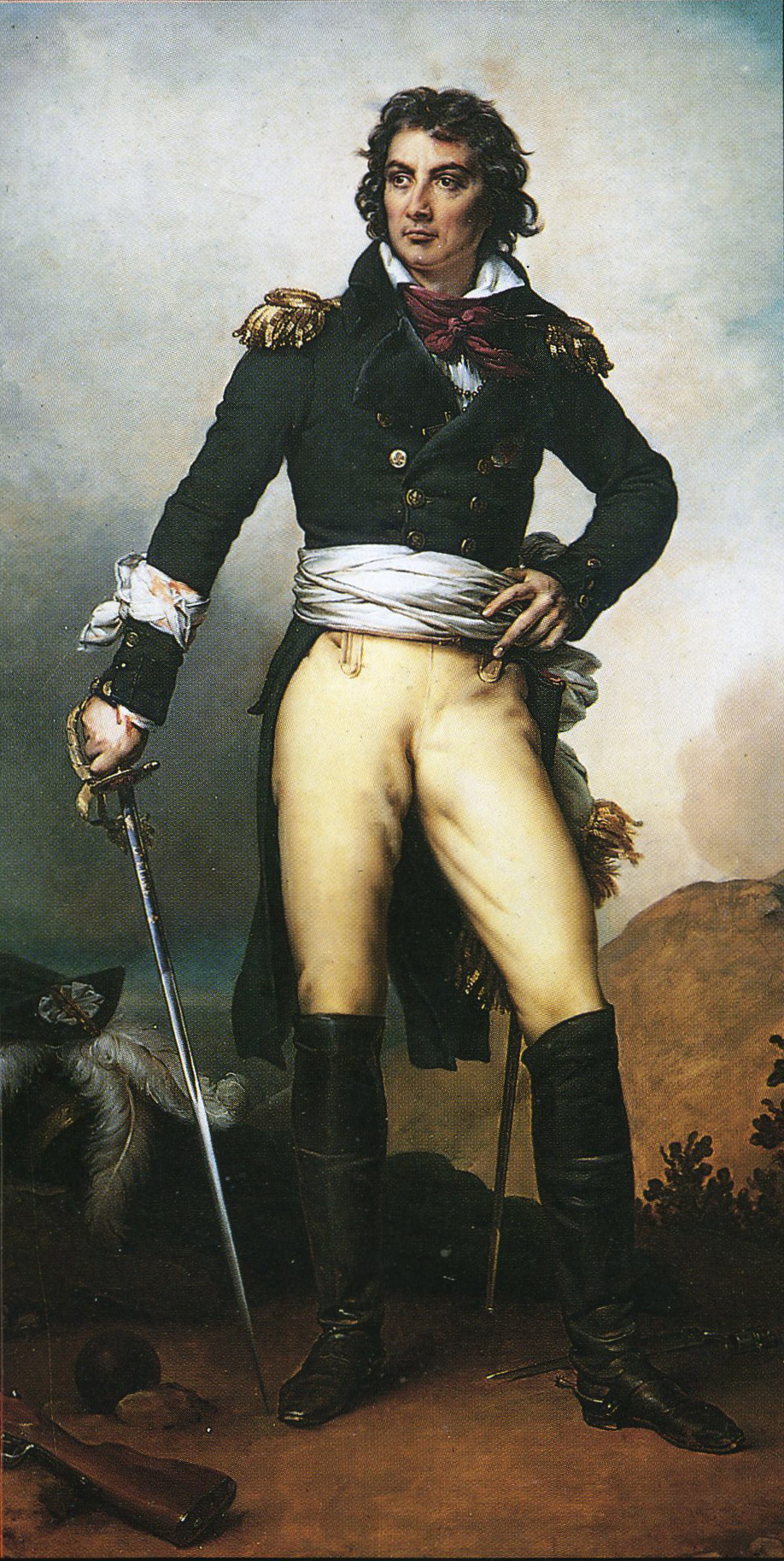
Maurice Gigost d'Elbée

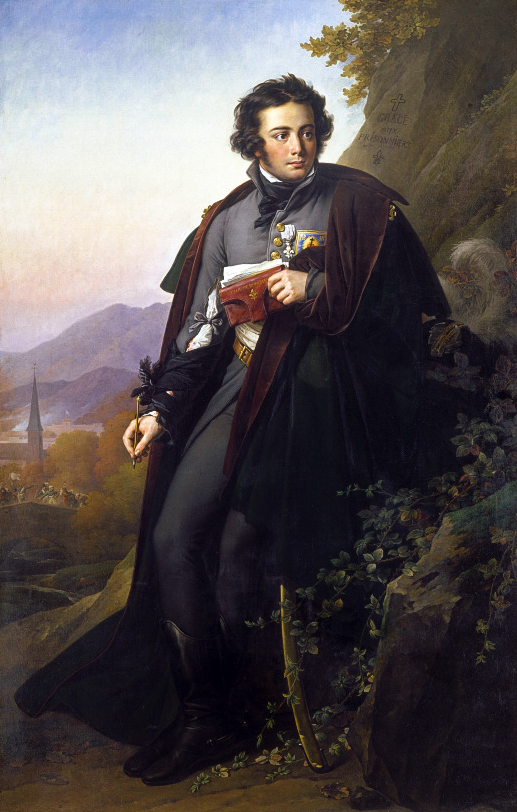
Charles de Bonchamps

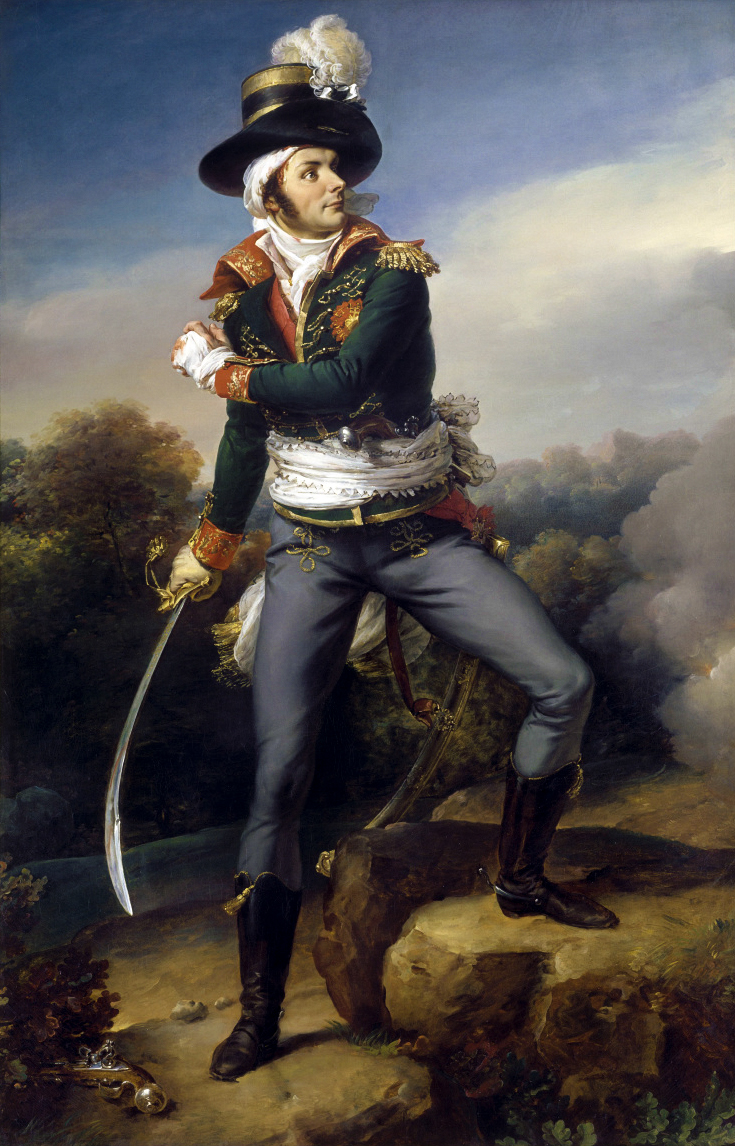
François-Athanase Charette de La Contrie

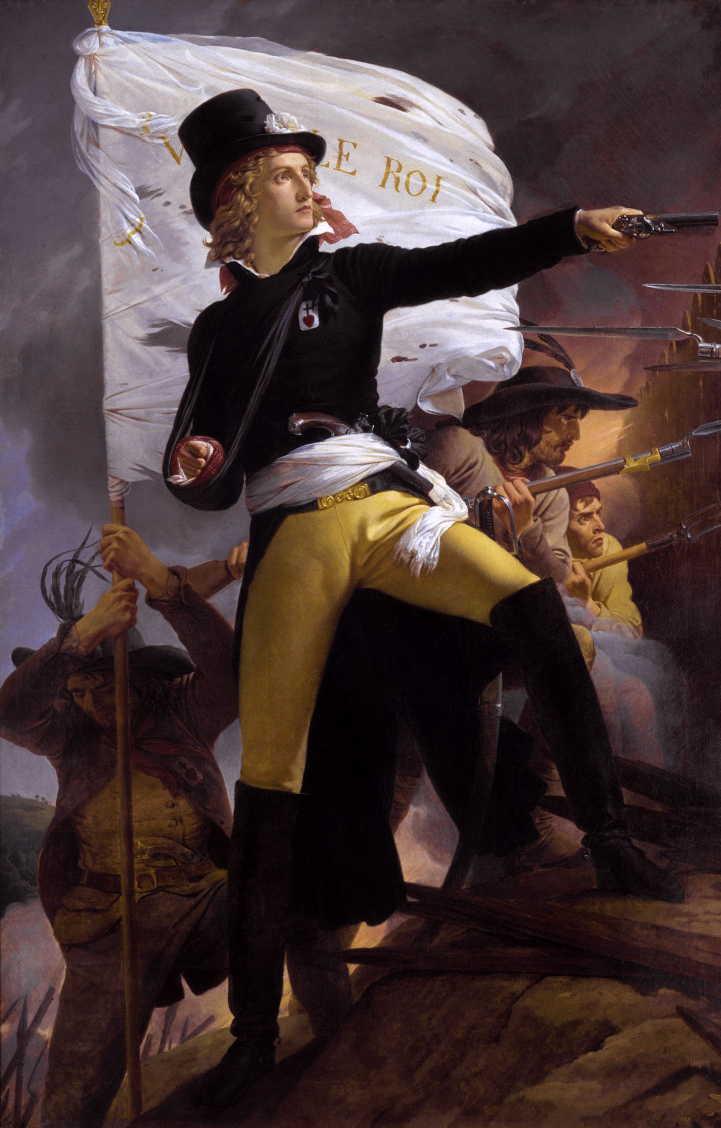
Henri de la Rochejaquelein

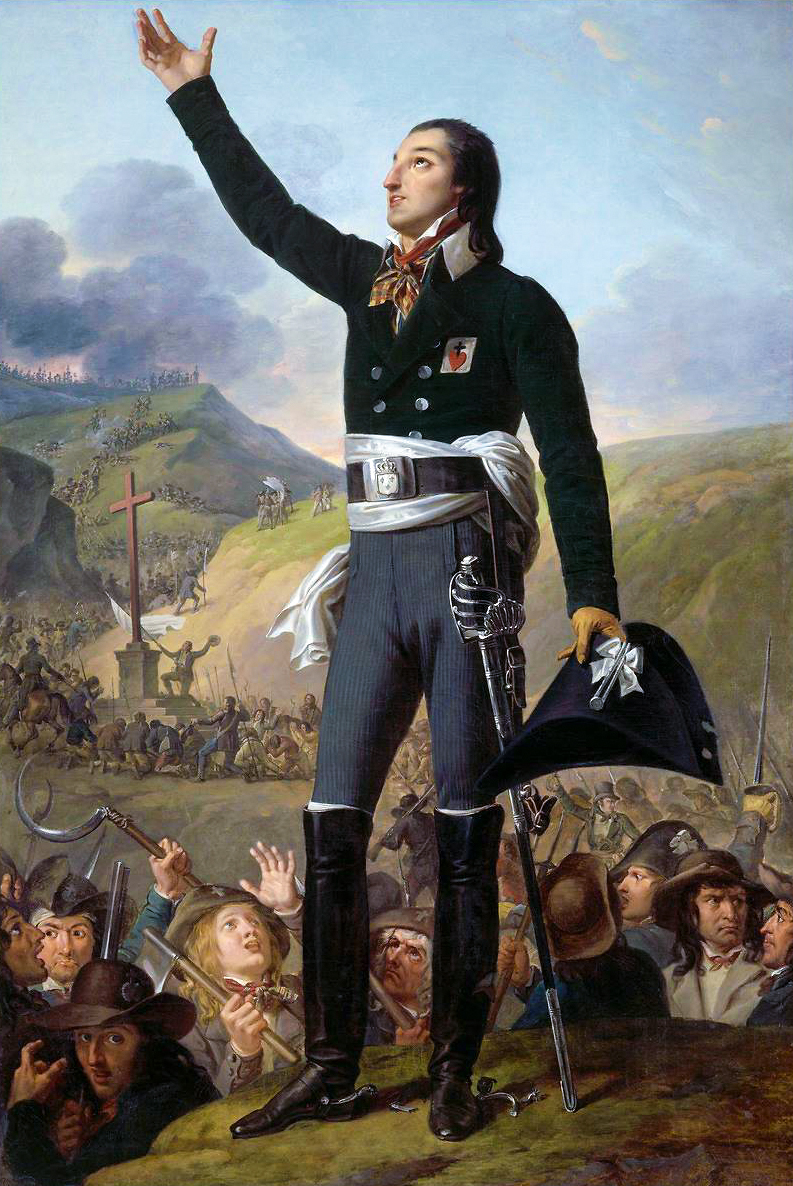
Louis Marie de Lescure

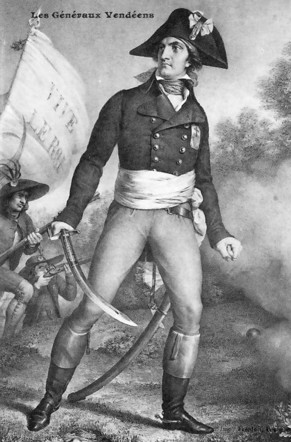
Jean-Nicolas Stofflet

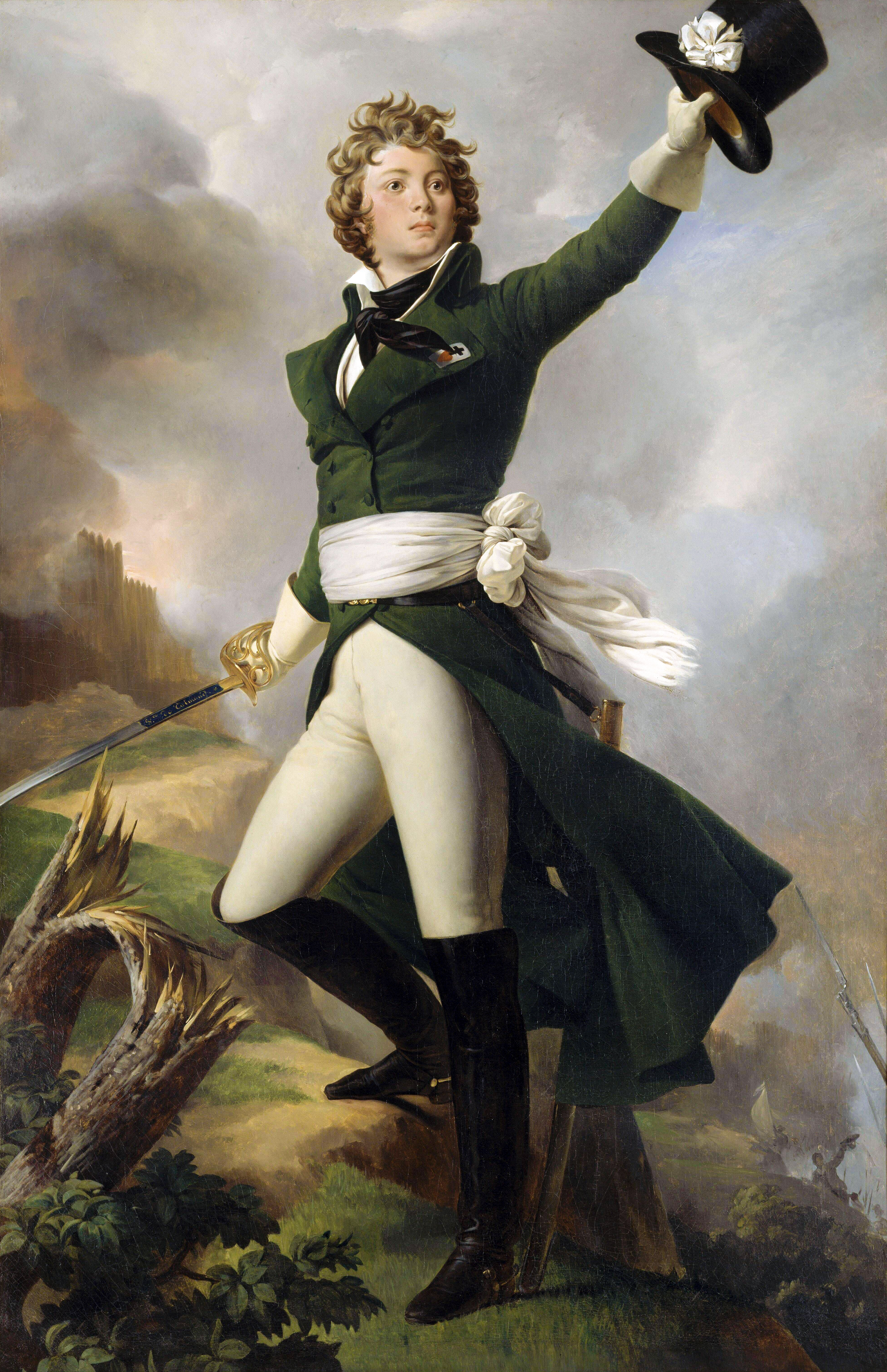
Antoine-Philippe de La Trémoïlle, Prince de Talmont

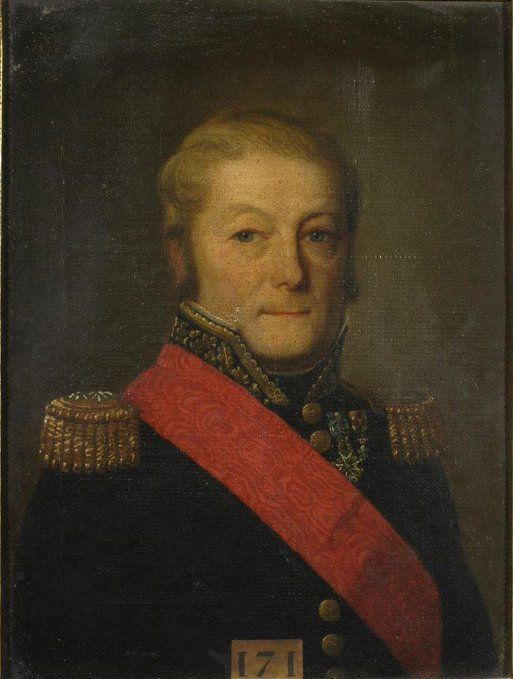
Charles Sapinaud de La Rairie

Other leaders include: Jacques Nicolas Fleuriot de La Fleuriais and Charles Aimé de Royrand.

== Catholic and Royal Army of Brittany ==
Catholic and Royal Army of Brittany
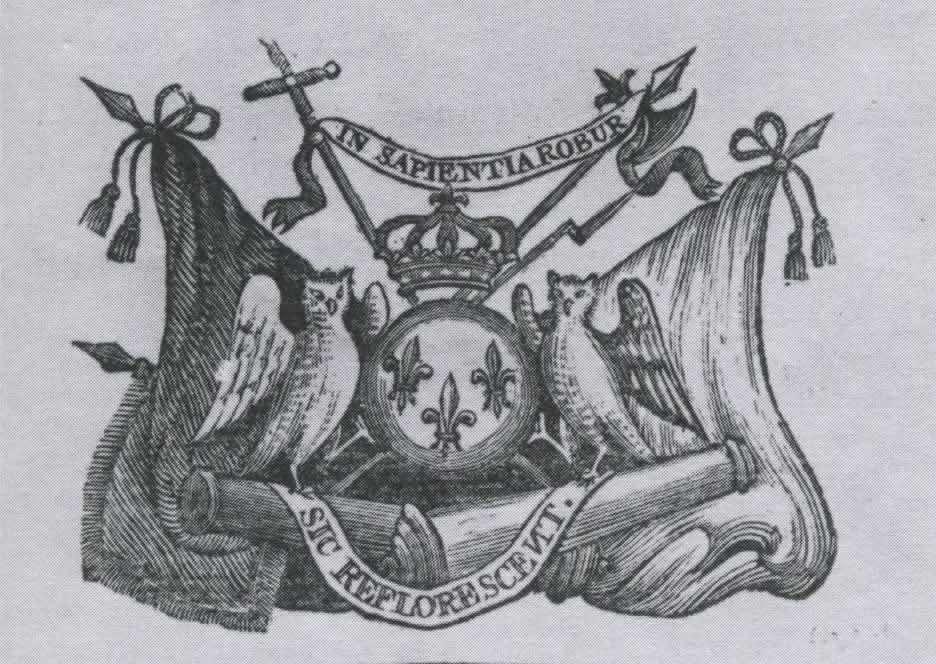
- Chouan emblem
- Active: 1794–1796; 1799-1800; 1815; 1832
- Country: France, Brittany
- Allegiance: Kingdom of France
- Branch: • Army of Morbihan • Army of Rennes and Fougères • Army of Maine, Anjou and Haute-Bretagne • Army of the Côtes du Nord
- Type: Chouan
- Size: 30,000 to 40,000 men
- Mottos: In Sapientia Robur, Sic Reflorescent (Strength is in patience, the Lys will flower again)
- Colors: White cockade
- Engagements: Chouannerie; Quiberon expedition

Commanders
- Notable commanders: • Joseph de Puisaye • René Augustin de Chalus • Jean de Béhague de Villeneuve • Georges Cadoudal

Insignia

From the Breton association of La Rouërie, this army was created by Joseph de Puisaye to unify the different chouans divisions.

On 15 October 1794, Puisaye was named Lieutenant General of the army of Brittany by the Count Charles of Artois, future king Charles X of France.

Following the failure of the Quiberon expedition in July 1795, Puisaye's commandment was questioned, and the army was broken into factions, especially with the army of Morbihan commanded by Cadoudal who did not recognize the authority of the Lieutenant General. Other factions were the army of the Côtes du Nord, and the army of Maine, Anjou and of Haute-Bretagne. Puisaye was only recognized by the army of Rennes and Fougères, although he still gathered support from the princes.

Finally, Puisaye resigned in 1798. After René Augustin de Chalus commanded for a short while, then the Count of Artois chose Marigny to succeed him but he refused. The commandment went to Béhague who only stayed a few months in Brittany during the year 1798 and headed back to England.

In the end, it was Georges Cadoudal, named Major General of Béhague, who led the command of the army. Dead in 1804, Cadoudal was named Marshal of France after his death.

== Catholic and Royal Army of Normandy ==
Catholic and Royal Army of Normandy
- Active: 1795–1800
- Country: France; Normandy and Maine: Orne, southern Manche, northern Mayenne
- Allegiance: Kingdom of France
- Type: Chouan
- Size: 5,000 to 10,000 men
- Engagements: Chouannerie

Commanders
- Notable commanders: • Louis de Frotté

The Catholic and Royal Army of Normandy, sometimes simply named Royal Army of Normandy because it hosted a few Protestants in its ranks, was an army of Chouans commanded by Louis de Frotté. In Normandy, its territory was limited to the Orne and southern Manche, and in Maine only a few zones in northern Mayenne.
