= Charles Aimé de Royrand =

- Born: 14 March 1726; Saint-Fulgent, France
- Died: 5 December 1793 (aged 67) Baugé-en-Anjou, Maine-et-Loire, France
- Allegiance: Kingdom of France
- Branch: French Army
- Service years: (Kingdom of France) ?–1780, 1793
- Conflicts: American Revolutionary War; War in the Vendée; Battle of Luçon; Battle of Chantonnay; Battle of Cholet; Battle of Entrames
- Awards: Order of Saint-Louis

Charles Aimé de Royrand (French pronunciation: [ʃaʁl ɛme də ʁwaʁɑ̃]; 14 March 1726 – 5 December 1793) became a Vendean leader in the War in the Vendée, a revolt against the French Revolution. He joined the French Royal Army and served in an infantry regiment during the American Revolutionary War before retiring to his estates in 1780. When the Vendean insurrection broke out in 1793 he was chosen as the leader of the southern army. He led rebel forces at Luçon, Cholet and Entrames. He was fatally wounded at Entrames on 26 October and died at Baugé-en-Anjou.

== Early life ==
Charles Aimé de Royrand was born on 14 March 1726 in Saint-Fulgent, one of three sons of Charles Samuel de Royrand and Louise Jacquette Sageot, all named Charles. The two others were Charles Louis and Charles Augustin. A fourth son René François was born in 1735. Charles Aimé joined the Navarre Infantry Regiment and later transferred to the Armagnac Regiment. After fighting in the American Revolutionary War and possibly in the earlier French and Indian War, he returned to France in 1780 and retired to his properties which were located near Saint-Fulgent, Chavagnes-en-Paillers and Saint-Georges-de-Montaigu. During his years of military service he was awarded the Order of Saint-Louis.

== Vendean rebellion ==
=== Army command and Luçon ===
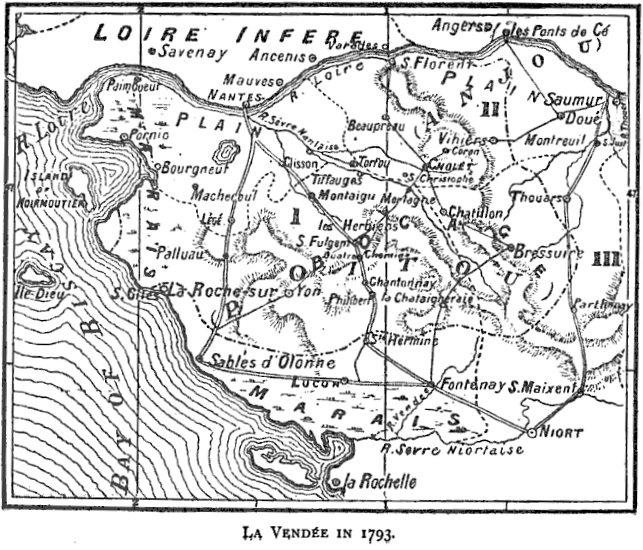
Map of La Vendée in 1793

Upon the outbreak of the War in the Vendée, the local Vendeans offered to make Royrand their leader but he was reluctant to accept at first. He was soon recognized as leader of the so-called Army of the Center which defended the southern front of the Vendée. He proved to be a capable organizer while assigning his second-in-command Charles Sapinaud de La Rairie to lead the rebels in the field. The rebels formed into three main forces of which the Army of Upper Vendée was the largest, with up to 50,000 men. The Army of Lower Vendée under former naval officer François de Charette had as many as 20,000 rebels in the western marshes, while the Army of the Center counted between 10,000 and 12,000 men in the area around Les Herbiers and Chantonnay.

The rebels were opposed by the Republican Army of the Coasts of Cherbourg, Army of the Coasts of Brest under Jean Baptiste Camille Canclaux and Army of the Coasts of La Rochelle under Armand Louis de Gontaut, Duke of Biron. While Canclaux held Angers, Nantes and the west coast department of Loire-Inférieure, Biron was responsible for Les Sables-d'Olonne, Luçon, Fontenay-le-Comte, Niort and Saumur. In March the Republicans deployed 34 volunteer and two regular infantry battalions plus two regiments of cavalry. The National Convention rushed reinforcements to the scene including 12 poorly-disciplined volunteer battalions from Paris under Antoine Joseph Santerre.

In May 1793, while Royrand's army watched the southern edge of the Vendée, the rebels seized Bressuire and Thouars in the east. On 13 May they captured La Châtaigneraie but were repulsed from Fontenay on the 16th. The main army of 35,000 men assembled under Charles de Bonchamps, Maurice d'Elbée, Henri de La Rochejaquelein and Louis Marie de Lescure. On 25 May, the Vendean army defeated 14,000 Republicans under Alexis Chalbos in the Battle of Fontenay-le-Comte, taking 40 guns. This was followed by a rebel victory over Jacques-François Menou's division at the Battle of Saumur on 9 June in which the Vendeans captured 46 cannons. On 28 June, Royrand attacked Luçon but Claude Sandoz and its Republican garrison drove him off. On the 29th Canclaux repulsed a Vendean attack in the Battle of Nantes. Meanwhile, Biron sent François Joseph Westermann on a destructive raid into the heart of the Vendée. The main rebel army massed against Westermann and routed his division in the First Battle of Châtillon on 5 July.

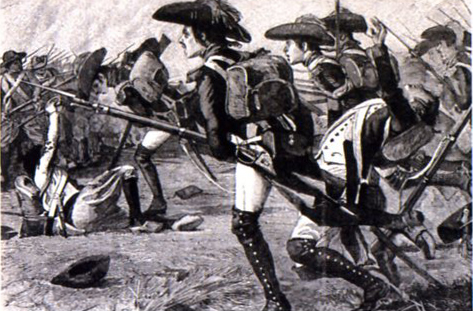
Battle of Luçon

The Republican generals disagreed over how to deal with the rebellion. Biron and Canclaux wanted to mount a concentric attack while the generals and representatives on mission at Saumur, which had been reoccupied, desired to attack from the east and drive the rebels against the seacoast. Ignoring Biron's wishes, 12,000 men of the Saumur division under Jacques-Marie Pilote La Barolière moved west. On 18 July, the Vendeans attacked and routed the Republicans in the Battle of Vihiers. Biron was recalled to Paris and sent to the guillotine on 31 December 1793. Biron was replaced by Jean Antoine Rossignol, a political demagogue. Facing Royrand in the south were the Luçon division under Augustin Tuncq and the Fontenay Division under Chalbos. On 25 July Tuncq occupied Chantonnay, burning the town and destroying food and weapons before returning to Luçon. Provoked by this raid, Royrand and Elbée with 12,000–15,000 rebels attacked Luçon but were repulsed on 30 July.

Wanting to secure their southern flank, the Vendeans determined to move against Luçon again. On 12 August the forces of Charette and Elbée joined Royrand's Army of the Center at Chantonnay. Overconfident in rebel numerical superiority, Lescure advised engaging the Republicans in an open plain. Because François Séverin Marceau-Desgraviers carried out an effective reconnaissance, Tuncq was aware that the rebels were massing for a big attack. He deployed 9,000 troops and 31 guns in a double line on some hills outside Luçon. On 14 August 1793, in the Battle of Luçon, 14,000–35,000 Vendeans mounted an assault with Charette and Lescure on the right, Elbée and Royrand in the center and La Rochejaquelein on the left. At first, Charette and Lescure's men pushed back the Republican left flank and overran five guns, but the attacks were poorly timed and the column of Elbée and Royrand came up too late. After the first Republican line retired, the second line stood up and launched a surprise counterattack. Marceau with some cavalry and infantry threw back the rebel right flank. The Republican artillery was ably handled, inflicting losses and demoralizing Royrand's men. La Rochejaquelein's column only arrived in time to cover the retreat. The Vendeans suffered 1,500 casualties and abandoned 18 guns.

=== Chantonnay, Cholet and Entrames ===
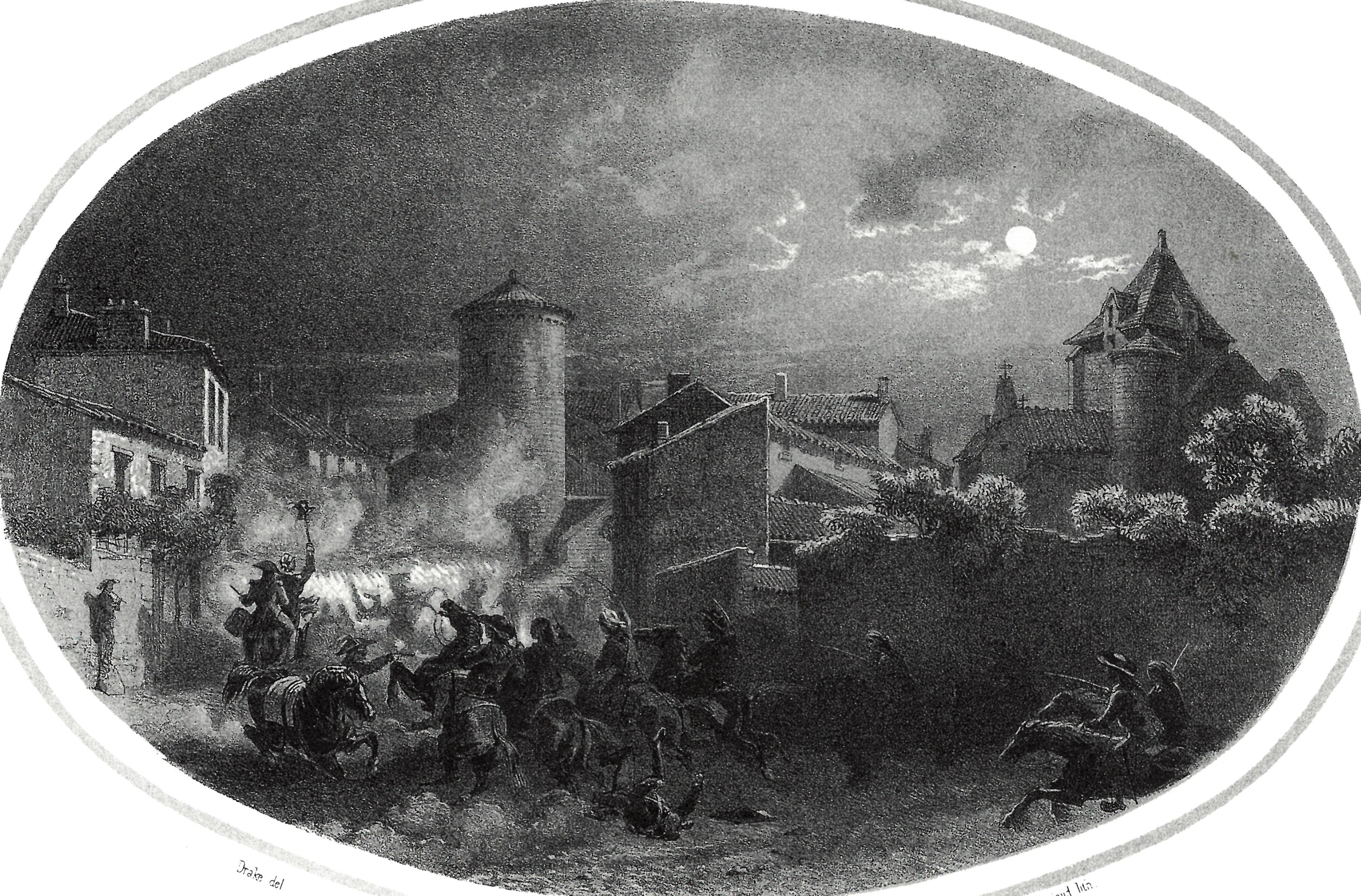
Battle of Saint-Fulgent

Tuncq sent 7,000 soldiers under René François Lecomte and Marceau north to occupy Chantonnay in an exposed position. Scolding his generals for not cooperating, Rossignol ordered Chalbos to seize La Châtaigneraie. Feeling threatened by Republican control of Chantonnay, the Vendean leaders decided to retake it. Sending Royrand to make a feint against Quatre Chemins, 25,000 rebels and 21 cannons attacked the Luçon Division. On 5 September 1793 the Vendeans crushed the Republicans in the Battle of Chantonnay. Only 2,500 of the 7,500 Republicans escaped the disaster and Lecomte and Marceau were ordered to rebuild the division. At this point the Republican position in the Vendée was saved by a Prussian blunder. On 23 July 1793 the Siege of Mainz ended with the capitulation of the French garrison. According to the terms, the French soldiers were paroled on condition that they not fight against the Coalition for one year. As Alexandre de Beauharnais pointed out, the terms did not exclude the garrison from fighting against Vendean rebels. Soon 14,000 veteran soldiers of the so-called Army of Mainz under Jean-Baptiste Annibal Aubert du Bayet were on the march for the Vendée.

In early September the reinforcements joined Canclaux at Nantes. The Republican generals and representatives agreed to mount a converging attack on the Vendée with the main thrust coming from Nantes. However, Rossignol failed to cooperate, ordering the Luçon and Fontenay Divisions to retreat. Consequently, with Royrand's army watching the quiet southern sector, the other Vendean armies concentrated against the remaining Republican columns. On 18 September, Santerre's Saumur Division marched into an ambush in the Battle of Coron and was routed. Canclaux's offensive made progress at first but his columns were beaten at the Battle of Tiffauges on 19 September and the Battle of Montaigu three days later. The Sables-d'Olonne Division was smashed by Charette at the Battle of Saint-Fulgent. Canclaux and Rossignol mounted a new offensive resulting in a success at the Battle of Saint-Symphorien on 6 October, but their earlier defeats and the conniving of the radical Charles-Philippe Ronsin brought about a reshuffling of Republican commanders in early October. Canclaux and Du Bayet were dismissed, Rossignol was transferred to lead a weakened Army of the Coasts of Brest and a new force, the Army of the West was placed under Jean Léchelle. The new army absorbed the Army of the Coasts of La Rochelle, Canclaux's troops at Nantes and the Army of Mainz.

At this time, the Vendean leaders failed to cooperate effectively. Charette became preoccupied with capturing Noirmoutier on the coast. In the east, the Saumur, Thouars and Fontenay Divisions united at Bressuire under Chalbos and Westermann and moved west. The Luçon and Sables-d'Olonne Divisions were ordered north to join Léchelle's main Republican army near Tiffauges. As the Luçon Division advanced, it captured Les Herbiers from 3,000 rebels under Royrand. The Republican columns moved swiftly, forcing the Vendeans forces led by Royrand, Elbée, Bonchamps and Lescure to regroup near Cholet. While trying to contact the main army's advance guard under Michel de Beaupuy, the Luçon Division was ambushed in the Battle of La Tremblaye on 15 October. After its commander became a casualty, Marceau took over and with help from Beaupuy, drove off the rebels. Lescure was badly wounded.

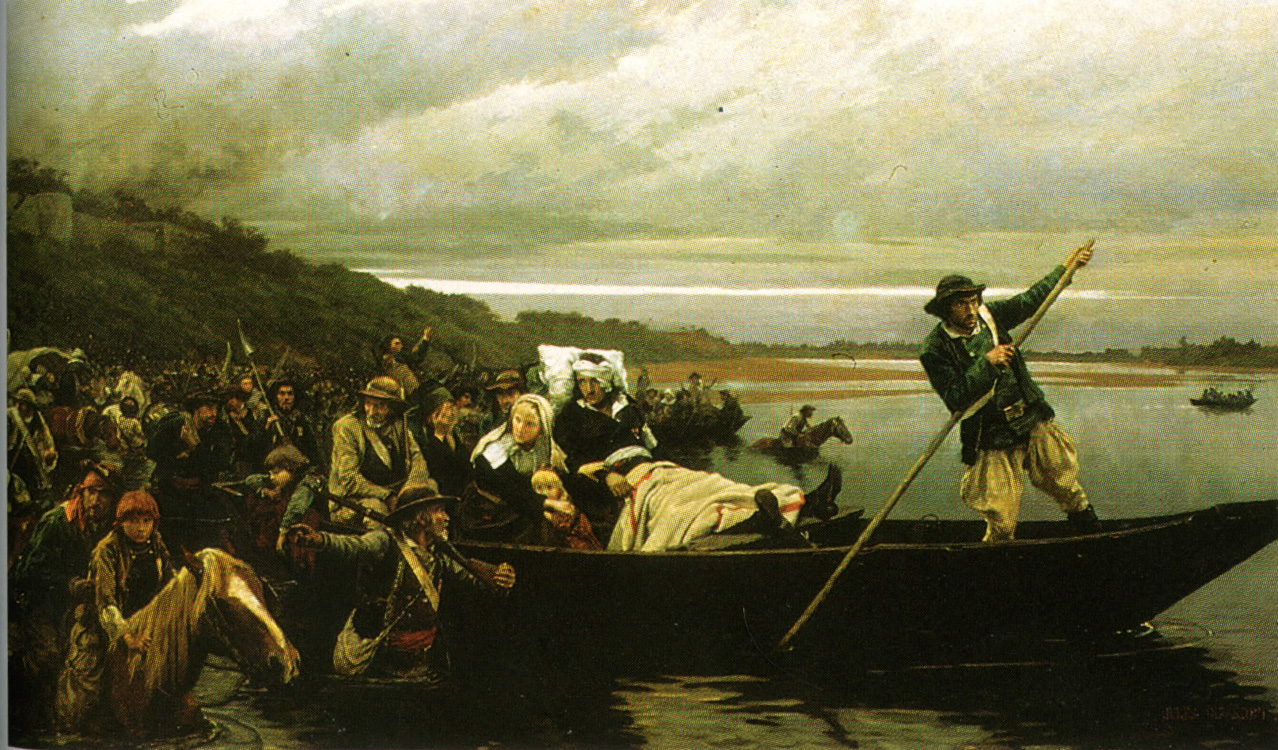
Crossing the Loire at Saint-Florent

The Republicans occupied Cholet on 16 October and Jean Baptiste Kléber prepared to defend the town from rebel attack. Kléber deployed 22,000 soldiers and 30 guns, many of them Army of Mainz veterans. He placed Beaupuy and Nicolas Haxo on the left, Marceau in the center and Louis Antoine Vimieux on the right. During the night Chalbos and François Muller arrived with 9,000 reinforcements. On 17 October 1793 the Republicans were attacked by 41,000 Vendeans in the Battle of Cholet. Elbée and Bonchamps led the center while Jean-Nicolas Stofflet and La Rochejaquelein directed the wings. Royrand was not mentioned. After a bitter struggle, the Republicans routed the rebels with heavy losses. Elbée was severely wounded and Bonchamps died the following day. The Vendean army crossed to the north bank of the Loire at Saint-Florent-le-Vieil while the Republican soldiers celebrated their victory by running amok in Cholet and Beaupréau.

The Catholic and Royal Army, numbering 50,000, including 30,000–35,000 fighting men, elected La Rochjaquelein as their leader. They hoped to recruit Bretons to their cause, but the local people stayed home. The Vendeans moved to Laval with the Army of the West in pursuit. Léchelle quickly proved incapable of leading an army. After passing through Château-Gontier on 25 October, the Republican advance guard under Westermann blundered into a Vendean ambush south of Laval and was driven back. Though both Kléber and Marceau advised caution, Léchelle and the representatives insisted on an advance the next day. Unwisely, Léchelle ordered that the 25,000-man army march to battle in a single column. The next morning, Beaupuy and Marceau encountered the rebels near Entrammes. Kléber soon brought his division into the fight, but with the army strung out on a single road it proved difficult for the Republicans to get more troops into action. In fact Léchelle remained in the rear during the entire battle and failed to commit the reserve. Led by La Rochejaquelein and Royrand in the center, the Vendeans forced back the Republicans, turning captured cannon against their former owners. After another rebel force hit them in flank, the Republican soldiers began to flee. In the Battle of Entrames on 26 October the Vendeans dispersed the Army of the West inflicting very heavy losses and capturing 19 cannons.

Royrand was mortally wounded at Entrames. After he fell, La Rochejaquelein urged Royrand's followers to avenge their leader. Royrand lingered until 5 December 1793, when he died near Baugé-en-Anjou.

== Family ==
The family suffered tragically in the rebellion. Brother Charles Augustin was born on 9 March 1731 at Montaigu and became a French naval officer. Wounded fighting the British in the Battle of Ushant on 27 July 1778, he acquired the nickname Bras-Coupé (Arm-Off). He retired to his home in Chavagnes-en-Paillers. When the revolt broke out, the Vendeans asked Charles Augustin to lead them and he was killed in the fighting at La Guérinière on 19 March 1793. His nephew was Charles César, son of brother Charles Louis Royrand de Roussière and Thérèse Charlotte du Chaffault, daughter of Admiral Louis Charles du Chaffault de Besné. Charles César de Royrand and his wife Emile Louise Gabrielle de Suzannet emigrated to Brussels in 1791. He fled to the Dutch Republic and finally to England where he joined the emigre Hector Regiment as a sous-lieutenant. Taking part in the Expedition to Quiberon Charles César was captured and executed by the Republicans on 2 August 1795.
