= Army of the Coasts of La Rochelle =

- Active: 30 April – 5 October 1793
- Country: (France) French First Republic
- Branch: Army
- Type: Army
- Size: Six divisions
- Engagements: War in the Vendée; Battle of Thouars (May); Battle of Fontenay-le-Comte (May); Battle of Saumur (June); First Battle of Châtillon (July); Battle of Vihiers (July); Battle of Luçon (Aug.); Battle of Chantonnay (Sept.); Battle of Coron (Sept.); Battle of Pont-Barré (Sept.); Battle of Saint-Fulgent (Sept.)

Commanders
- Notable commanders: Armand Louis, Duke of Biron; Jean Antoine Rossignol

The Army of the Coasts of La Rochelle (French: Armée des côtes de La Rochelle) was an army of the French Revolution which was created on 30 April 1793 and responsible for defending a region from the mouth of the Loire River south to the Gironde. Despite its relatively short existence, the army fought numerous battles during the War in the Vendée including Thouars, Fontenay-le-Comte, Saumur, First Châtillon, Vihiers, Luçon, Chantonnay, Coron and Saint-Fulgent. Many of the battles resulted in Republican defeats at the hands of the Vendean Royalists. Of the two principal army commanders, Armand Louis de Gontaut, Duke of Biron was dismissed and later executed by guillotine while Jean Antoine Rossignol was a political appointee who was generally acknowledged to be incompetent. The army was absorbed by the Army of the West on 5 October 1793.

== History ==
=== Creation and evolution ===
The Army of the Coasts of La Rochelle traced it existence to the Army of the Interior which became the Army of the Reserve on 1 March 1793 with Jean-François de Berruyer as commander. The army's area of operations included the 17th, 18th, 19th, 21st and 22nd Military Divisions. On 25 March the Army of the Reserve was charged with putting down the rebellion on the south bank of the Loire River. It was split into two corps, one under Berruyer guarded Nantes while the other under Louis Charles Antoine de Beaufranchet d'Ayat covered the Vendée. Two representatives on mission served with each corps, making them virtually independent of each other. During this period the right wing was also called the Army of Leigonyer, Angers, Chinon, Saumur or Tours while the left wing was at various times referred to as the Army of d'Ayat, Fontenay, Niort or Vendée. On 8 April Armand Louis de Gontaut, Duke of Biron was directed to take command of the region from the south bank of the Loire to the mouth of the Garonne River while a different body was responsible for the north bank of the Loire. On 25 April there was another directive which was quickly superseded.

The Army of the Coasts of La Rochelle was created by a 30 April 1793 decree of the Executive Council of the National Convention. From 1–27 May, François Leigonyer was the army's interim commander in addition to directing the right wing. In May, d'Ayat served as the left wing commander. The army was responsible for the defence of the coasts and areas between the Gironde estuary and the mouth of the Loire, including the north bank of the river upstream as far as Ingrandes. This area encompassed the former provinces of Poitou and Saintonge. Biron was commander-in-chief from 28 May until 16 July. Jacques-Marie Pilotte La Barolière led the right wing while Alexis Chalbos led the left wing from 17 to 30 July. Jean Antoine Rossignol assumed command on 31 July and relinquished leadership on 5 October, except for the period 25–30 August when Antoine Joseph Santerre was temporarily in charge. By a decree of 2 October 1793, the Army of the Coasts of La Rochelle was merged with the Army of Mainz and part of the Army of the Coasts of Brest, becoming the Army of the West. The decree was carried out on 6 October.

=== Opposing forces ===
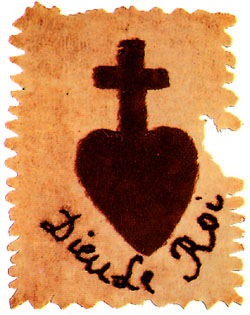
Patch worn by the Vendean rebels

On 24 February 1793 the National Convention ordered mass conscription to fill up armies depleted by desertion. The Vendée rebellion was provoked by conscription, the anti-Catholic laws promulgated by the convention and the high cost of food. The revolt broke out in March and soon 50,000 Vendean rebels were at large. There were three main rebel forces, the largest of which was the Army of Upper Vendée or Grand Army, controlling as many as 50,000 men. Its leaders were Charles de Bonchamps, Jacques Cathelineau, Maurice d'Elbée, Louis Marie de Lescure, Henri de La Rochejaquelein and Jean-Nicolas Stofflet. The two other significant bodies were the Army of Lower Vendée under François de Charette with 15,000–20,000 men in the Marais (western marshes) and the Army of the Center led by Charles Aimé de Royrand with 10,000–12,000 rebels in the area around Les Herbiers and Chantonnay.

The Army of the Coasts of La Rochelle was responsible for Les Sables-d'Olonne, Luçon, Fontenay-le-Comte, Niort and Saumur. North of the Loire, the Army of the Coasts of Brest under Jean Baptiste Camille Canclaux defended Angers, Nantes and Loire-Inférieure department on the west coast. In March the Republicans deployed 34 volunteer and two regular infantry battalions plus two regiments of cavalry. That month an otherwise idle Louis-Alexandre Berthier was posted to the Vendée. In April the government sent the 35th Legion of Gendarmes, good troops. In May the German Legion including officers Pierre Augereau and François Séverin Marceau-Desgraviers arrived. The unit was composed of German deserters and former Swiss Guards and fought well, though a number deserted to the rebels. In a misguided effort to increase troop strength, six men were drafted from each company in the Army of the North and Army of the Ardennes and sent to Orléans to organize. This expedient produced 12,000 soldiers which were formed into 15 battalions, but the units had no cohesion and sometimes behaved poorly. Finally, 12 badly-disciplined and flight-prone volunteer battalions arrived from Paris under Antoine Joseph Santerre.

=== Operations of Biron ===
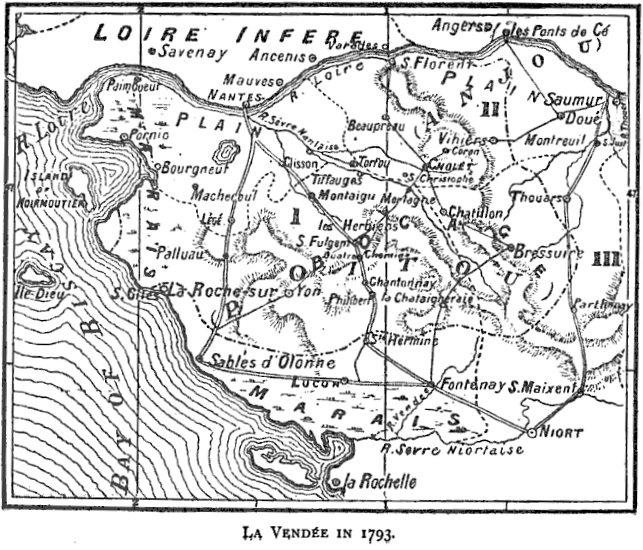
Map of La Vendée in 1793

In May 1793 the Vendeans or Whites went on the offensive in the east. Bonchamps had 10,000 rebels watching Angers, Elbée and 20,000 men of the Grand Army threatened Bressuire, Charette watched Nantes and Les Sables-d'Olonne and Royrand held the southern front. Bonchamps, Lescure and La Rochejaquelein took Bressuire, won the Battle of Thouars and stormed La Châtaigneraie on 13 May. At Pissotte near Fontenay-le-Comte the Vendeans were beaten by Chalbos on 16 May and lost all their artillery. However, they rallied and gathered 35,000 men under Bonchamps, Elbée, Lescure and La Rochejaquelein and attacked again. In the Battle of Fontenay-le-Comte on 25 May out of 14,000 effectives, Chalbos lost 4,000 men and 40 guns. Vendean casualties were estimated at 1,000. A rebel advance on Niort was put off because the Republicans or Blues under François Nicolas de Salomon and Leigonyer threatened Thouars and Cholet. In the west, the garrison of Les Sables-d'Olonne repulsed Cathelineau, Charette and Stofflet, but the Vendeans won other actions and menaced Nantes.

A particularly motley force gathered at Saumur together with their own representatives on mission. Santerre's Paris battalions were in a perpetual state of disorder, while recently promoted officers strolled the streets with prostitutes. On 7 June 1793 the Vendeans defeated Leigonyer at Doué-la-Fontaine and chased the Blues right into Saumur. Deeming the Republican position too strong, the White army temporarily pulled back while their leaders planned an attack. Hearing that Salomon was marching north from Thouars, a column of Vendeans fell on his division at Montreuil-Bellay and wiped out half the Republican force, sending the survivors fleeing south to Niort. On 11 June the Whites defeated the Blues in the Battle of Saumur. The Vendeans numbered about 20,000 with 100 cannon while the Republicans counted 16,000 soldiers plus some reinforcements. Guy Coustard de Saint-Lo directed the right flank, Santerre the center and Berthier the left, while Jacques-François Menou commanded troops in the town. Recently appointed the army chief of staff, Berthier repulsed the first assault, but Coustard was threatened by his own men and Santerre's troops threw down their muskets and ran away. Menou and Berthier, who were both wounded, tried to lead a cavalry charge, but the horsemen joined the rout. The Blues lost 8,000 men and 46 artillery pieces. After reorganizing the beaten division at Tours, Berthier soon reoccupied Saumur.

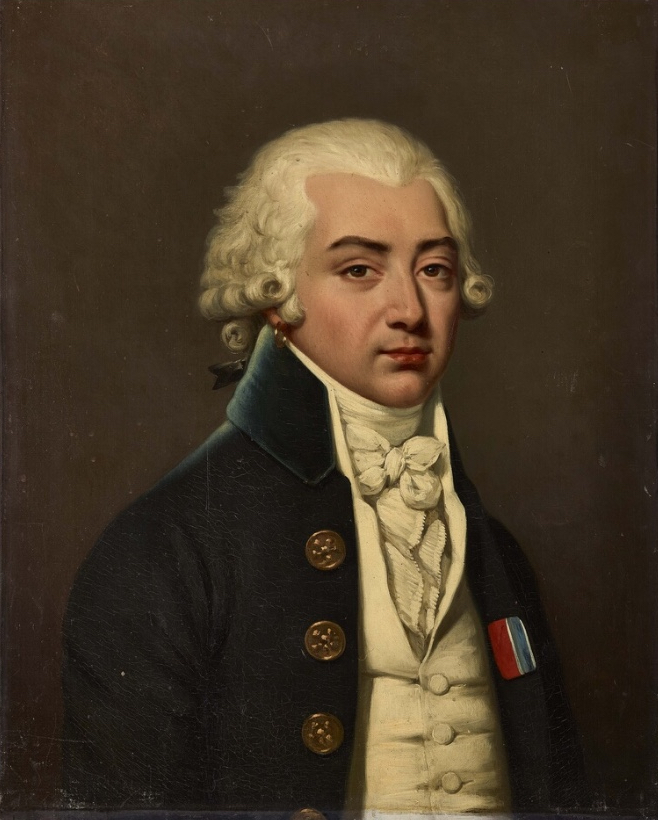
Duke of Biron

The Grand Army crossed the Loire and began marching west along the north bank of the river under the command of Cathelineau. They planned to attack Nantes in conjunction with Charette and 20,000 rebels on the south bank. However, many Vendeans returned to their farms so that only 10,000 attacked the city on the north bank. The Whites fought their way into the center of the city but after Cathelineau was fatally hit, they withdrew and recrossed the Loire. The Battle of Nantes on 29 June 1793 was won by Canclaux and 12,000 troops of the Army of the Coasts of Brest. On 28 June Royrand mounted an attack on Luçon in the south but Claude François Sandoz and his Republican garrison repulsed it despite being outnumbered 6,000 to 800. Asked to help in the defense of Nantes, Biron ordered François Joseph Westermann on a diversion into the Vendée but failed to support his subordinate. After plundering and burning Parthenay and Amailloux, Westermann's column fought its way into Châtillon-sur-Sèvre on 3 July. His force was smashed by the rebels and he lost two-thirds of his troops on 5 July in the First Battle of Châtillon.

The generals and representatives at Saumur, including Berthier, planned to drive the rebels west against the seacoast and crush them there. From his headquarters at Niort, Biron argued that this action might cause the rebels to overrun a port and open communications with the Royal Navy. He and Canclaux wanted to mount a concentric offensive instead. Finding the independent-minded group at Saumur persisting with their plan and being supported by the Committee of Public Safety, Biron sent in his resignation. He was soon recalled to Paris and executed by guillotine on 31 December 1793. Meanwhile, Jacques-Marie Pilotte La Barolière set out from Saumur with a major expedition. On 15 and 17 July they repulsed rebel attacks but the unfitness of their soldiers shook the resolve of the commanders. La Barolière complained that his troops were drunk and insubordinate while Berthier advised retreat after witnessing two units firing at one another. Led by a body of German and Swiss deserters, the Whites attacked on 18 July at Vihiers. The advance guard under Menou held its ground for a long time but many of the Blues ran away after only catching a glimpse of the enemy. Louis-Nicolas Davout covered the rout that followed with some cavalry and Santerre escaped by jumping his horse over a wall. In the Battle of Vihiers the Royalists lost 1,000 killed and wounded out of 12,000. The Republicans suffered losses of 2,000 killed and wounded and 3,000 men captured out of 14,000; they lost 25 out of 30 guns.

=== Operations of Rossignol ===
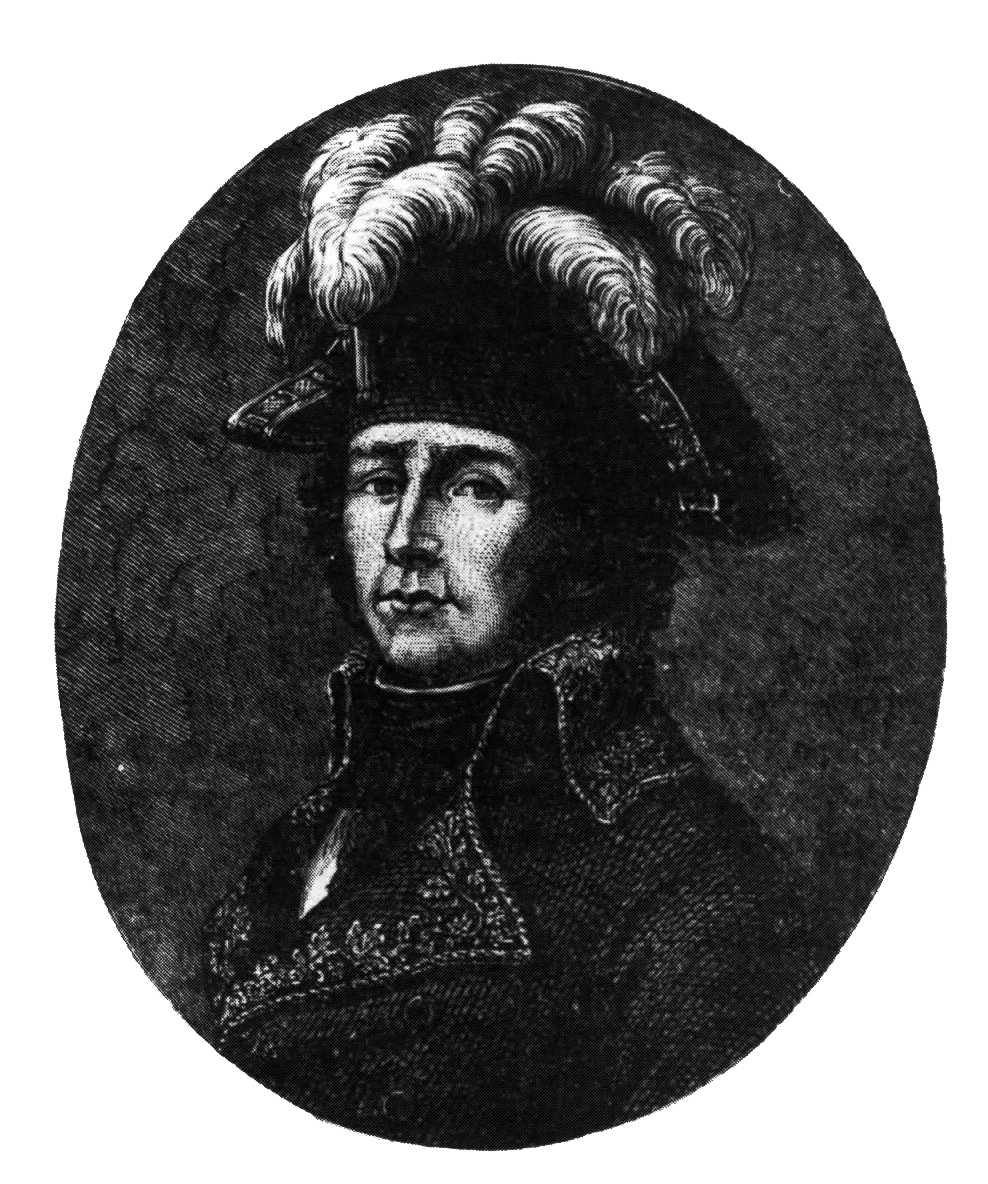
Jean Rossignol

After Biron's recall, La Barolière led the right wing while Chalbos led the left wing between 16 and 31 July 1793. In the south, Augustin Tuncq held Luçon and Chalbos defended Fontenay. Tuncq raided Chantonnay on 25 July, torching the town and wrecking supplies before marching back to Luçon. Reacting to this event, Royrand and Elbée attacked Luçon with 12,000 to 15,000 rebels on 30 July but were driven off. Finally, the Committee of Public Safety named Jean Antoine Rossignol as Biron's replacement. When Rossignol first arrived at Niort with the 35th Legion of Gendarmes he announced that he and his men would not fight the rebels unless they outnumbered them six to four. In disgust, Biron unbuckled his sword remarking to the representatives that he would not lead such cowards. Nevertheless, the politically potent Rossignol was promoted lieutenant colonel on 9 April. Arrested by Westermann for urging a battalion to mutiny and sent to Paris, he was sent back and rushed through the grades of rank, emerging as general of division on 15 July. Hearing of his appointment as commander-in-chief, Rossignol's wife rushed to the convention and assured the deputies that her husband was totally unfit for the post.

Rossignol celebrated his promotion by looting the hotel in Fontenay where he was staying and giving the women's clothing to the whores who traveled with him and his staff. He also stole Biron's horses. For these and other crimes, the representatives on mission suspended him from command on 22 August and set him to Paris. In the convention, Jean-Lambert Tallien defended him, "it is not a question whether Rossignol drinks, whether he pillages, but whether the commissioners have the right to dismiss him." Tallien later explained that he was delighted to replace the Duke of Biron by someone from a class that the nobles scorned. With the approval of Maximilien Robespierre, Rossignol was sent back to the army in triumph.

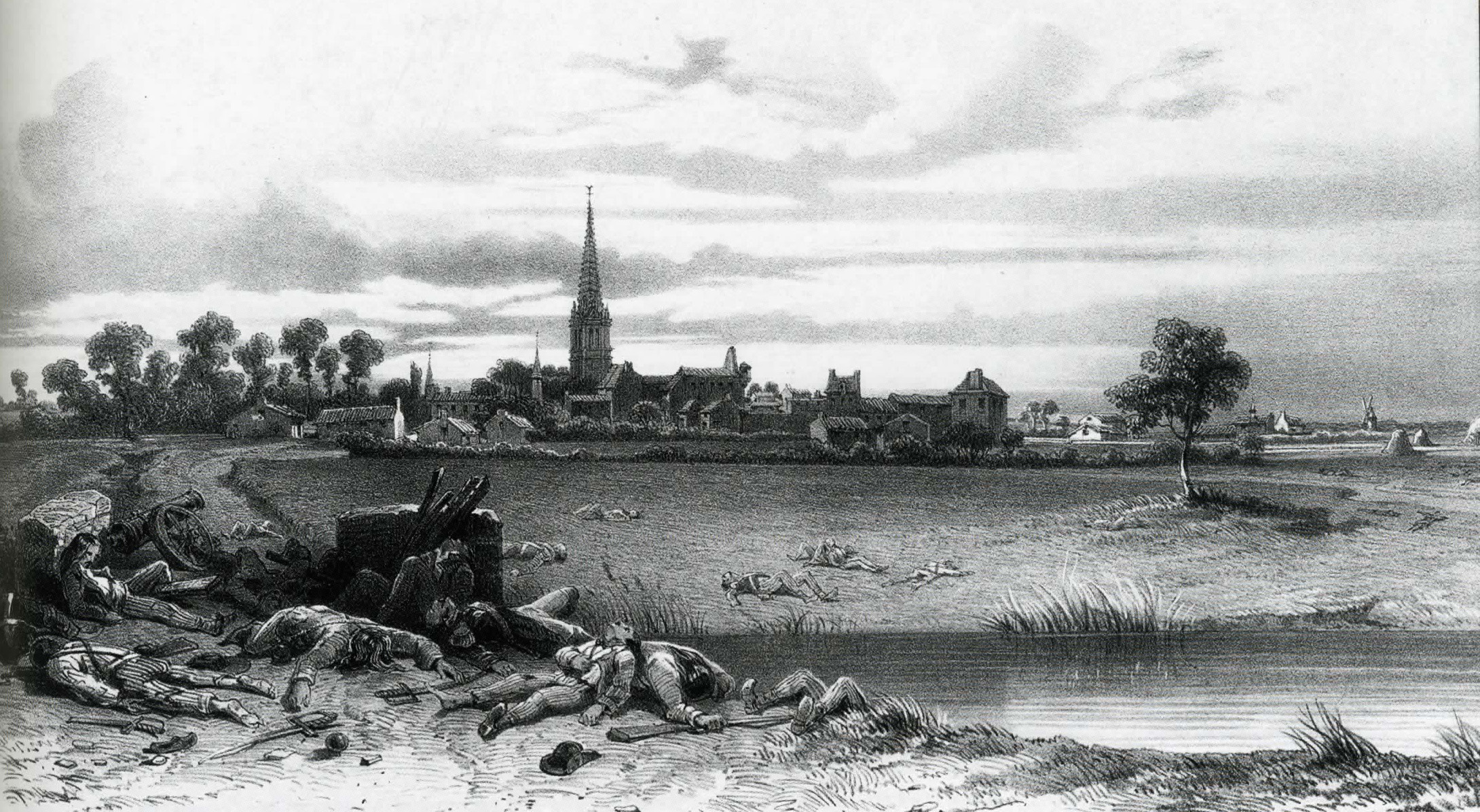
Battle of Luçon

On 12 August 1793 Vendeans under Charette, Elbée and Lescure joined Royrand's men at Chantonnay. Warned by his scouts, Tuncq arranged 9,000 troops and 31 guns on the hills outside Luçon. In the Battle of Luçon on 14 August 1793, between 14,000 and 35,000 rebels attacked the Republicans on an open plain unfavorable to Vendean tactics. Because the three assaulting columns were poorly coordinated, the Royalists were beaten with losses of 1,500 men and 18 field pieces. Tuncq occupied Chantonnay but soon returned to Luçon, leaving René François Lecomte and Marceau in charge of 7,000 troops in an exposed position. Back in army command Rossignol made the rounds of his divisions, rebuking his generals for not cooperating. He ordered the Luçon division to sweep the country to the west and keep touch with the Sables d'Olonne division. He also ordered Chalbos to capture La Châtaigneraie. On 2 September a council of war at Saumur decided to reinforce Canclaux's army with 16,000 veterans from the Army of Mainz under Jean-Baptiste Annibal Aubert du Bayet and make the main thrust into the Vendée from Nantes. Significantly, du Bayet's officers refused to serve under the political appointee Rossignol. The arrival of Canclaux's army at Legé around 11–13 September would be the signal for the six divisions of the La Rochelle army to advance. However, the result of a battle would throw these plans out of joint. On 5 September 1793, 20,000 Whites smashed 8,000 Blues in the Battle of Chantonnay inflicting 4,000 casualties for the loss of only 500 men. Another authority asserted that the Vendeans had 25,000 men and 21 guns, and that only 2,500 of the 7,000 Republicans escaped the defeat.

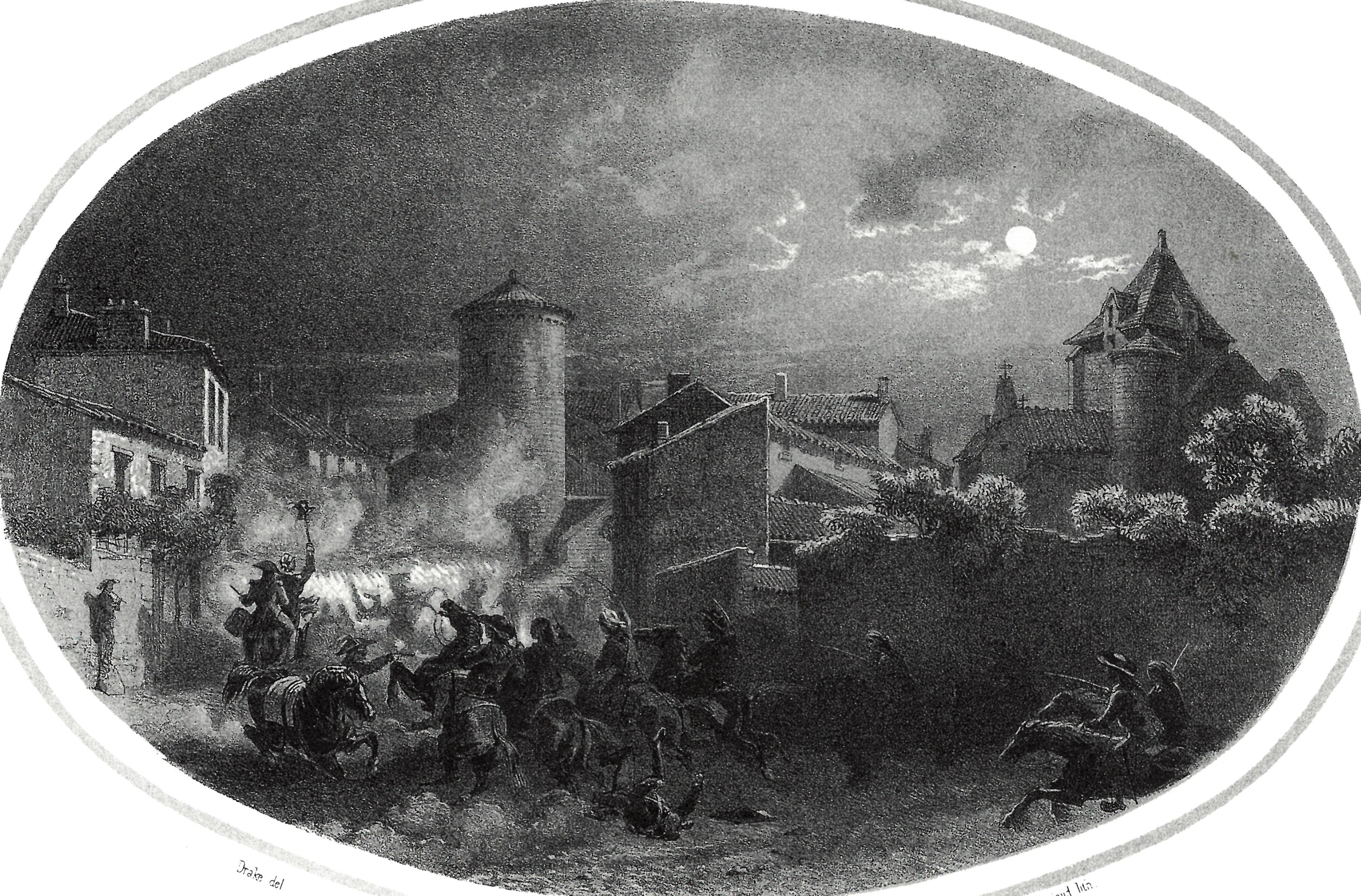
Battle of Saint-Fulgent

In the September invasion, the Vendean leaders utilized the strategy of the central position to concentrate upon each of the isolated Republican divisions that attempted to invade the area of rebellion. Though Rossignol agreed to cooperate with the 2 September plan, the defeat at Chantonnay made him change his mind. He ordered Chalbos to pull back to Fontenay and the Luçon division, now under Louis Paul Beffroy, to return to Luçon. At the same time he foolishly authorized Santerre with the Saumur Division and Charles François Duhoux with the Angers Division to invade the Vendée from the east. At first, Santerre was successful at Doué-la-Fontaine and penetrated as far as Vihiers on 17 September. The next day he was ambushed in the Battle of Coron and routed, losing all his field guns. Duhoux's column suffered a similar defeat at the Battle of Pont-Barré on the 20th. The Brest Army made great progress in the west but on 19 September, the attacks of Jean Baptiste Kléber were repelled in the Battle of Tiffauges and Jean-Michel Beysser was defeated at the Battle of Montaigu on the 22nd. In the final blow, Charette mauled the Sables d'Olonne division under Jean Quirin de Mieszkowski in the Battle of Saint-Fulgent on 22 September. The Blues lost 3,000 out of 6,000 soldiers while the Whites lost only 300 casualties out of 11,000 men engaged.

As Canclaux and du Bayet pushed forward into the Vendée once again in early October, their advance was suspended by an order of 29 September 1793 dismissing them. The Army of the Coasts of La Rochelle, the Army of Mainz and units of the Army of the Coasts of Brest south of the Loire were merged into a new formation called the Army of the West. Rossignol was transferred to command a diminished Army of the Coasts of Brest while Jean Léchelle became commander-in-chief of the new army. Political general Charles-Philippe Ronsin brought about the change by persuading Minister of War Jean Baptiste Noël Bouchotte that Canclaux and du Bayet caused the recent defeats. The decision also appeared to show that Ronsin and Bouchotte's confidence in their favorite Rossignol had faded.

== Commanders ==
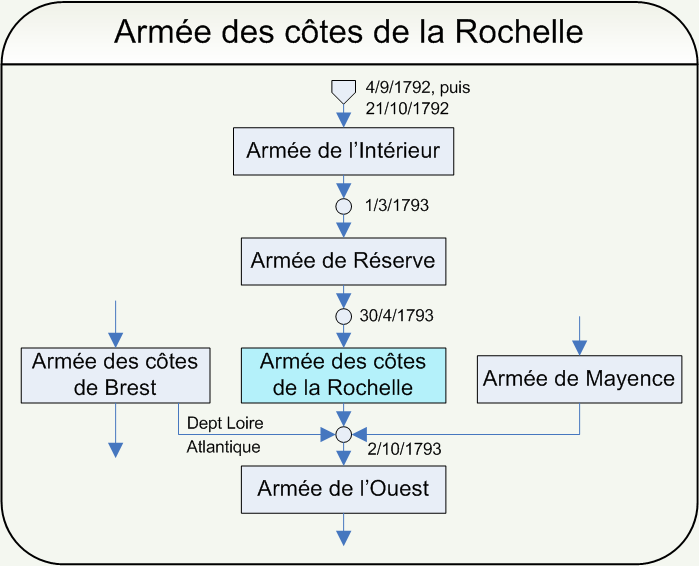
Evolution of the Army of the Coasts of La Rochelle

=== Army of Reserve ===
- 1 March – 28 April 1793: Jean-François de Berruyer (Commander-in-chief and Right wing commander)
  - 1 March – 30 April 1793: Louis Charles Antoine de Beaufranchet d'Ayat (Left wing commander)
- 29 – 30 April 1793: François Leigonyer (Commander-in-chief and Right wing commander)

=== Army of the Coasts of La Rochelle ===
- 1 – 27 May 1793: François Leigonyer (Commander-in-chief and Right wing commander)
  - 1 – 27 May 1793: Louis Charles Antoine de Beaufranchet d'Ayat (Left wing commander)
- 28 May – 16 July 1793: Armand Louis de Gontaut, Duke of Biron
- 16 – 31 July 1793: Jacques-Marie Pilotte La Barolière (Right wing) and Alexis Chalbos (Left wing)
- 31 July – 24 August 1793: Jean Antoine Rossignol
- 25 – 30 August 1793: Antoine Joseph Santerre (provisional)
- 31 August – 5 October 1793: Jean Antoine Rossignol
