= François-Xavier =

François-Xavier is a French masculine given name. Notable people with the name include:

- François-Xavier Archambault (1841–1893), a lawyer and political figure in Quebec
- François-Xavier Audouin (1765–1837), a French clergyman and politician during the French Revolution
- François-Xavier Babineau (1825–1890), a Canadian Catholic priest
- François-Xavier Bélanger (1833–1882), a French-Canadian naturalist and museum curator
- François-Xavier Bellamy (born 1985), French philosopher and politician
- François-Xavier Brunet (1868–1922), a Canadian Roman Catholic priest and bishop of Mont-Laurier, Québec
- François-Xavier Cloutier (1848–1934), a Canadian Roman Catholic Bishop
- François-Xavier de Donnea (born 1941), a Belgian politician
- François-Xavier de Feller (1735–1802), a Belgian author
- François-Xavier de Peretti, a French politician
- François-Xavier Dulac (1841–1890), a farmer, merchant and political figure in Quebec
- François-Xavier Dumortier (born 1948), a French Roman Catholic priest
- François-Xavier Fabre (1766–1837), a French painter of historical subjects
- François-Xavier Garneau (1809–1866), a French Canadian notary, poet, civil servant and liberal
- François-Xavier Lalanne (1927–2008), a French sculptor and engraver
- François-Xavier Larue (1763–1855), a farmer, notary and political figure in Lower Canada
- François-Xavier Lauch (born 1981), French civil servant
- François-Xavier Lemieux (1811–1864), a French Canadian lawyer and politician
- François-Xavier Lemieux (Quebec MLA) (1851–1933), a Quebec lawyer, judge and political figure
- François-Xavier Malhiot (1781–1854), a merchant, seigneur and political figure in Lower Canada
- François-Xavier Ménage (born 1980), French journalist
- François-Xavier Méthot (1796–1853), a Quebec businessman and political figure
- François-Xavier Nzuwonemeye, a former Rwandan soldier chiefly known for his alleged role in the Rwandan Genocide
- François-Xavier Octavie Fontaine (1762–1812), a French military in the American War of Independence, the French Revolutionary Wars and the Napoleonic Wars
- François-Xavier Ortoli (1925–2007), a French Gaullist politician and businessman
- François-Xavier Paradis (1844–1910), a Canadian politician
- François-Xavier Paré (1793–1836), a political figure in Lower Canada
- François-Xavier Poizat (born 1989), a French pianist
- François-Xavier Roth (born 1971), a French conductor
- François-Xavier Tessier (1799–1835), a doctor, publisher and political figure in Lower Canada
- François-Xavier Verschave (1945–2005), the founders of the French NGO Survie
- François-Xavier Villain (1950–2025), a member of the National Assembly of France
- François-Xavier Wurth-Paquet (1801–1885), a Luxembourgian politician, jurist and archaeologist

== See also ==
- Saint François-Xavier (1506–1552)
