= Audouin =

Audouin is a surname. Notable people with the surname include:

- François-Xavier Audouin (1765–1837), French clergyman and politician
- Jean Victoire Audouin (1797–1841), French naturalist
- Pierre Audouin (1768–1822), French engraver

== See also ==
- Audouin Dollfus (1924–2010), a French astronomer and aeronaut
- La Jarrie-Audouin, a commune in the Charente-Maritime department in southwestern France
- Audoin, king of the Lombards from 547 to 560
- Audoin (bishop) (609–684), a Frankish bishop, courtier, hagiographer and saint
