= Augustin Tuncq =

French military officer (1746–1800)

- Born: 27 August 1746; Conteville
- Died: 9 February 1800 (aged 53); Paris
- Relatives: Brutus Tuncq
- Military career
- Allegiance: France; French Republic
- Branch: French Army
- Service years: 1762–1800
- Rank: Général de division
- Conflicts: French Revolutionary Wars; War in the Vendée; Rhine Campaign of 1796

Augustin Tuncq, born in Conteville (Somme) on 27 August 1746 and died in Paris on 9 February 1800, served in the French military during the reign of the House of Bourbon and was a general of the French Revolutionary Wars. Most notably, he commanded Republican forces during the War in the Vendée and successfully defended Chalot from Vendean attack. He was a severe critic of his commander, Jean Antoine Rossignol, who later had him arrested and returned to Paris for trial. Accused by Jacques Hébert, he was saved from conviction only by the fall of the Hébertists, and the execution of Hébert himself. He subsequently commanded the coastal defenses at Brest, and was a divisional commander in Pierre Marie Barthélemy Ferino's column of the Army of the Rhine and Moselle during the Rhine Campaign of 1796. After the campaign he tried several times to retire; he died of injuries from a carriage accident in Paris in 1800.

== Family ==
Born on 27 August 1746 in Conteville, Somme, he was the son of a weaver, Jean Tuncq, and his wife Marie-Francoise Trogneux (or Trongneux). He married Marie-Francios Pelagie Chefeville, of Liancourt, Oise, in St. Philippe du Roule, Paris, on 26 November 1789. The couple had three children. One, Brutus, became a battalion chief by 1848.

== Military service ==
Tuncq entered the royal army as a private in 1762, first as a volunteer in the Regiment of Provence, and was a sergeant on 1 January 1768. He deserted on 30 June 1770, yet by 1773, he was a rider in the provost marshal's guard. When it was decommissioned on 19 October, he joined the guard of the General Provost (13 March 1774). In 1780, he became a captain in the Legion of the Pyrenees. By 1789 he was a captain in the National Guard.

== Service during the French Revolution ==
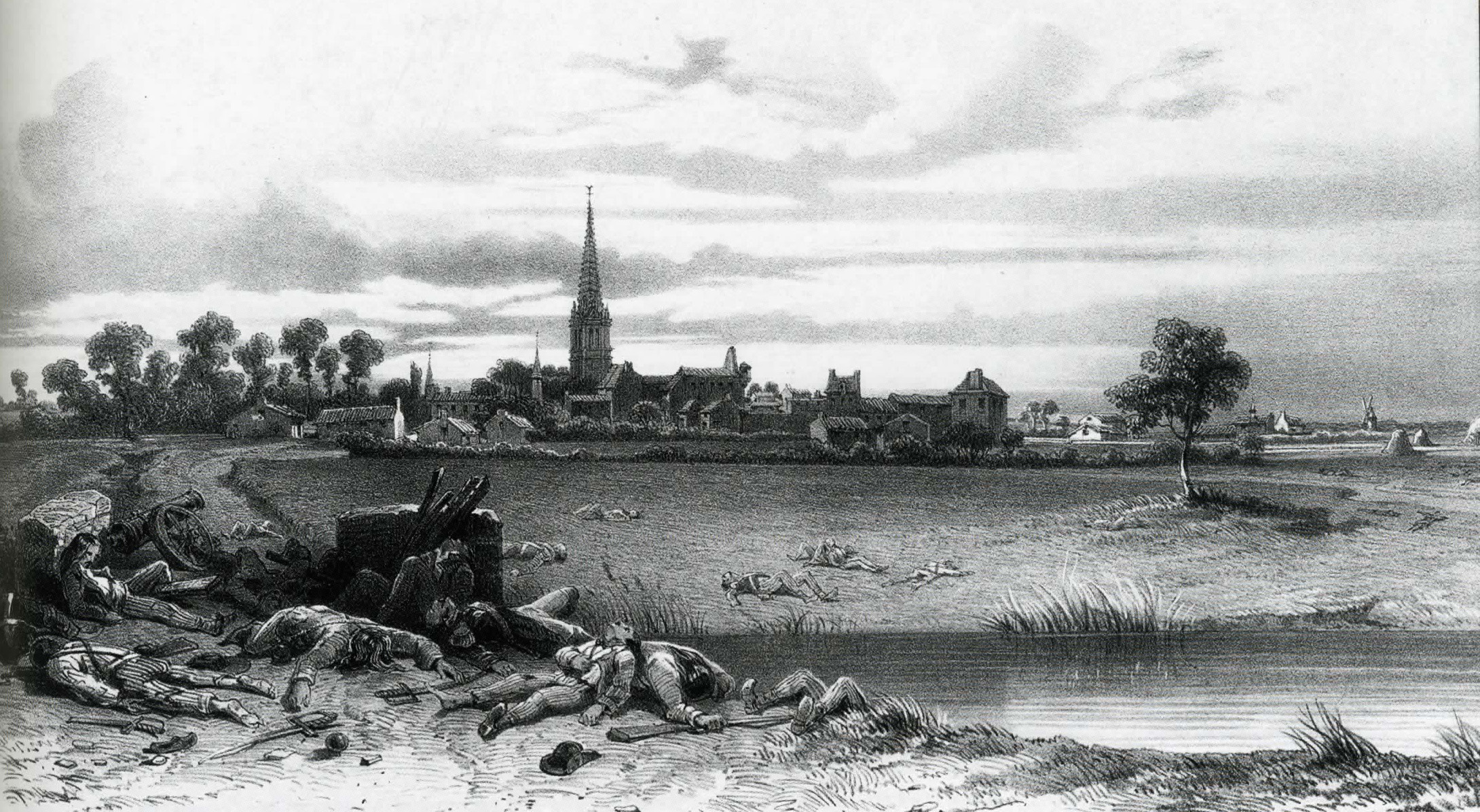
19th century representation of the Battle of Luçon

In June 1793, during the French Revolution, he was sent to fight in the War in the Vendée, where he replaced General Claude Sandoz in Luçon, who had been removed for flight. Upon this appointment, he was promoted to the rank of brigadier general. He accused his superior, General Jean Antoine Rossignol, the commander of the Army of the Coasts of La Rochelle, of incompetence. Rossignol removed him from command, but on his day of departure, the Vendéen insurgents attacked the city. Upon orders of the representatives on mission Jean François Marie Goupilleau de Fontenay and François Louis Bourdon then ordered him to temporarily reinstate his command. With 6,000 men, on 14 August, he defeated d’Elbée's superior force of 35,000 in the Battle of Luçon and he subsequently held both Luçon and Chantonnay. Consequently, supported by the powerful representatives, his victory earned him the rank of major general.

Injured after falling off a horse, he gave up his army to his second in command, general of division René François Lecomte, so he could receive treatment for his injuries at La Rochelle, but on 5 September, the division was crushed by d’Elbée's 20,000 men at the Battle of Chantonnay. Lecomte had not taken any precautions in building the defenses and left without issuing appropriate orders.

Rossignol took advantage of Lecomte's poor leadership to insure Tuncq's removal, placing him under arrest on 12 September. Sent to Paris, Tuncq vigorously defended himself before the military tribunal. He narrowly escaped the guillotine, but was acquitted after the case against him fell apart: in early 1794, Jacques Hébert and his colleagues fell from power and Hébert himself was executed. Tuncq was reinstated in his position in November 1794.

== Service in the Rhineland ==
"In 1795, he was assigned to the army at Brest and took command of the 4th Division in Nantes. During this assignment, Josnet de Laviolais reported to the military authorities that he was unfit; general Hoche described him as an immoral man without integrity or talent." Exonerated by a military tribunal, he was assigned to the 15th Division at Amiens, but the local authorities rejected him. He requested retirement, but was called to active duty on 4 March 1796 as a divisional commander of the second division of Ferino's Column of the Army of the Rhine and Moselle.

On 7 March 1797, he was arrested on unknown charges, and acquitted by the War Council on 8 August and reintegrated into the army on 9 September 1797; he was employed by the 15th division until 21 August 1799. He died in Paris at the Hospital of Val-de-Grâon on 9 February 1800, of injuries received in a riding accident.

In 1797, he published additional papers on his difficulties in the Vendée.
