= Edmond Marie Félix de Boislecomte =

French painter

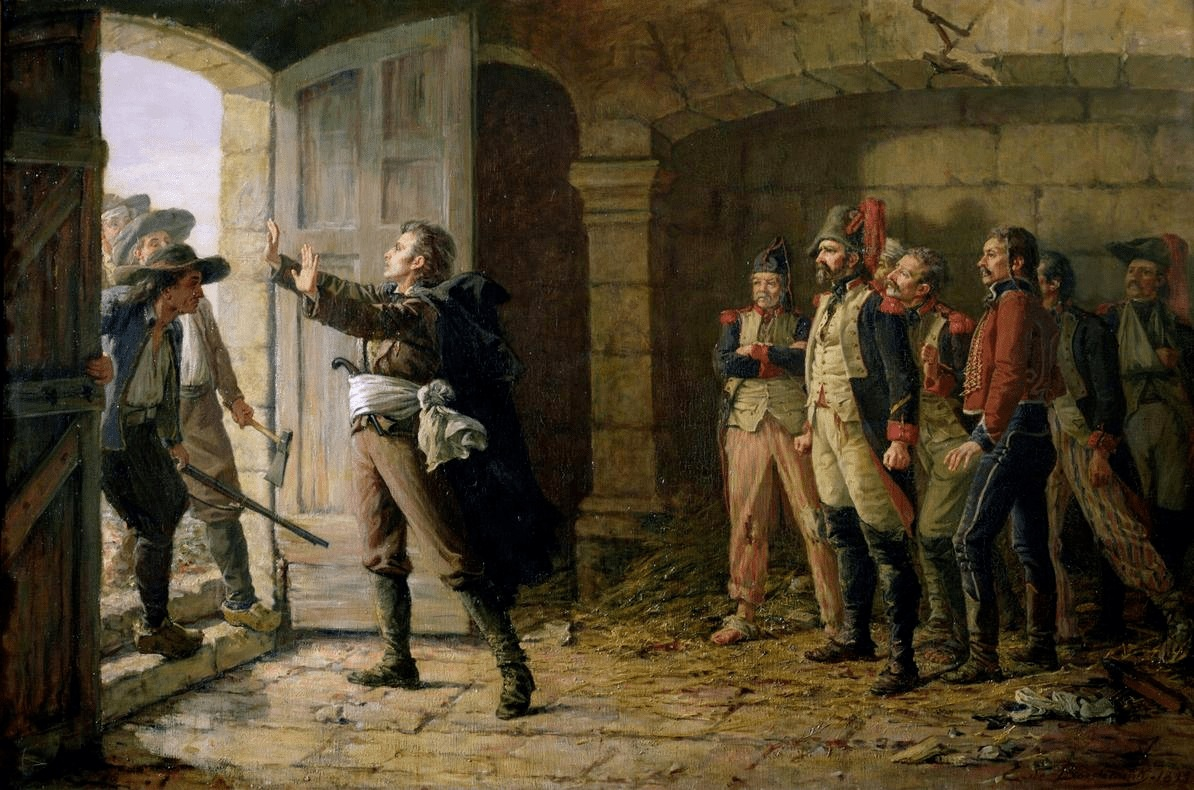
D'Elbée Protecting the Republican Prisoners After the Battle of Chemillé (April 11, 1793)

Vicomte Edmond Marie Félix de Boislecomte (28 April 1849, Arras – 1923, Arras) was a French painter of genre and historical scenes.

== Biography ==
He was awarded a law degree in Paris in 1871. Later, he studied at the Académie Julian, in the studios of Jean-Paul Laurens and Arsène-Hippolyte Rivey

He was married to Marguerite de Marbot, the granddaughter of General Marbot.

In 1879, he began exhibiting historical and Orientalist scenes at the annual Salon.

His works are preserved and may be seen at the Musée d'Art et d'Archéologie de Senlis, Musée des Beaux-Arts de Limoges, Musée des Beaux-Arts de Pau, Musée des Beaux-Arts de Rouen, and the Palais des Beaux-Arts de Lille.
