= Battle of Chantonnay (September 1793) =

Coordinates: 46°41′16″N 1°02′58″W

- Part of the War in the Vendée
Date	5 September 1793
Location	Chantonnay, Vendée, France
Result	Vendéean victory

Belligerents
(Kingdom of France) French Royalists	Republican France

Commanders and leaders
(Kingdom of France) Maurice d'Elbée (Kingdom of France) Charles de Bonchamps	(France) René Lecomte (France) François Marceau

Strength
25,000, 21 guns	7,500–8,000

Casualties and losses
500	4,000–5,000 casualties

The Battle of Chantonnay (5 September 1793) saw Royalist and Republican French forces clash at Chantonnay during the War in the Vendée. In the wake of his victory at Luçon, Augustin Tuncq sent 7,000 Republican troops under René François Lecomte to occupy an exposed position at Chantonnay. Reacting to the threat, 25,000 Vendeans rebels with 21 cannons led by Maurice d'Elbée and Charles de Bonchamps attacked and crushed the Republicans in a four-hour struggle in which François Séverin Marceau-Desgraviers distinguished himself. Only 2,500 out of 7,500 Republicans escaped the disaster.
