= René François Lecomte =

- Born: 14 May 1764; Fontenay-le-Comte, France
- Died: 15 October 1793 (aged 29); Bressuire, Deux-Sèvres, France
- Military career
- Allegiance: Kingdom of France; First French Republic
- Branch: Infantry
- Service years: (Kingdom of France) 1779–1785, 1791 (France) 1792–1793
- Rank: General of Division
- Conflicts: American Revolutionary War; War in the Vendée; Battle of Luçon; Battle of Chantonnay; Second Battle of Châtillon

René François Lecomte (French pronunciation: [ʁəne fʁɑ̃swa ləkɔ̃t]; born 14 May 1764 in Fontenay-le-Comte (Vendée), died on 15 October 1793 in Bressuire (Deux-Sèvres), was a general of the French Revolutionary Wars, and, in particular, the War in the Vendée.

== Military service ==
Lecomte entered military service in 1779 as an apprentice on board the "Saint-Michel"; he became a helmsman the following year, and participated in Pierre André de Suffren's expedition against the British in India. In 1780, he was a soldier of the Regiment Austrasie and was appointed sergeant major of that regiment in that year. In 1782, he among the first to enter the British entrenchments off the Island Gandelour defended by the English.

Back in France, he was discharged in 1785, and became manager of Maynard goods, Baron de Langon. In 1790, he filled the office of head of the local administration of the Vendée, and he enlisted on 19 September 1791. The following month, he was elected lieutenant of the 3rd battalion of volunteers of Deux-Sèvres.

In September 1792, he took temporarily command the battalion and November, he received the rank of battalion chief. He acquired his company and a legendary reputation for bravery. On 28 June 1793 he participated in the victory at the Battle of Luçon and was rewarded with patent brigade adjutant general in July 1793.

The 24th of the same month, he participated in the Battle of Pont-Charron, and was promoted to brigadier general on 30 July 1793. Augustin Tuncq, his divisional general, gave him overall, but temporary, command of the division so Tuncq could receive treatment for injuries at La Rochelle. However, on 5 September the division was crushed by Maurice d'Elbée's 20,000 men at the Battle of Chantonnay. Lecomte had not taken any precautions in building the defenses and left without issuing appropriate orders.

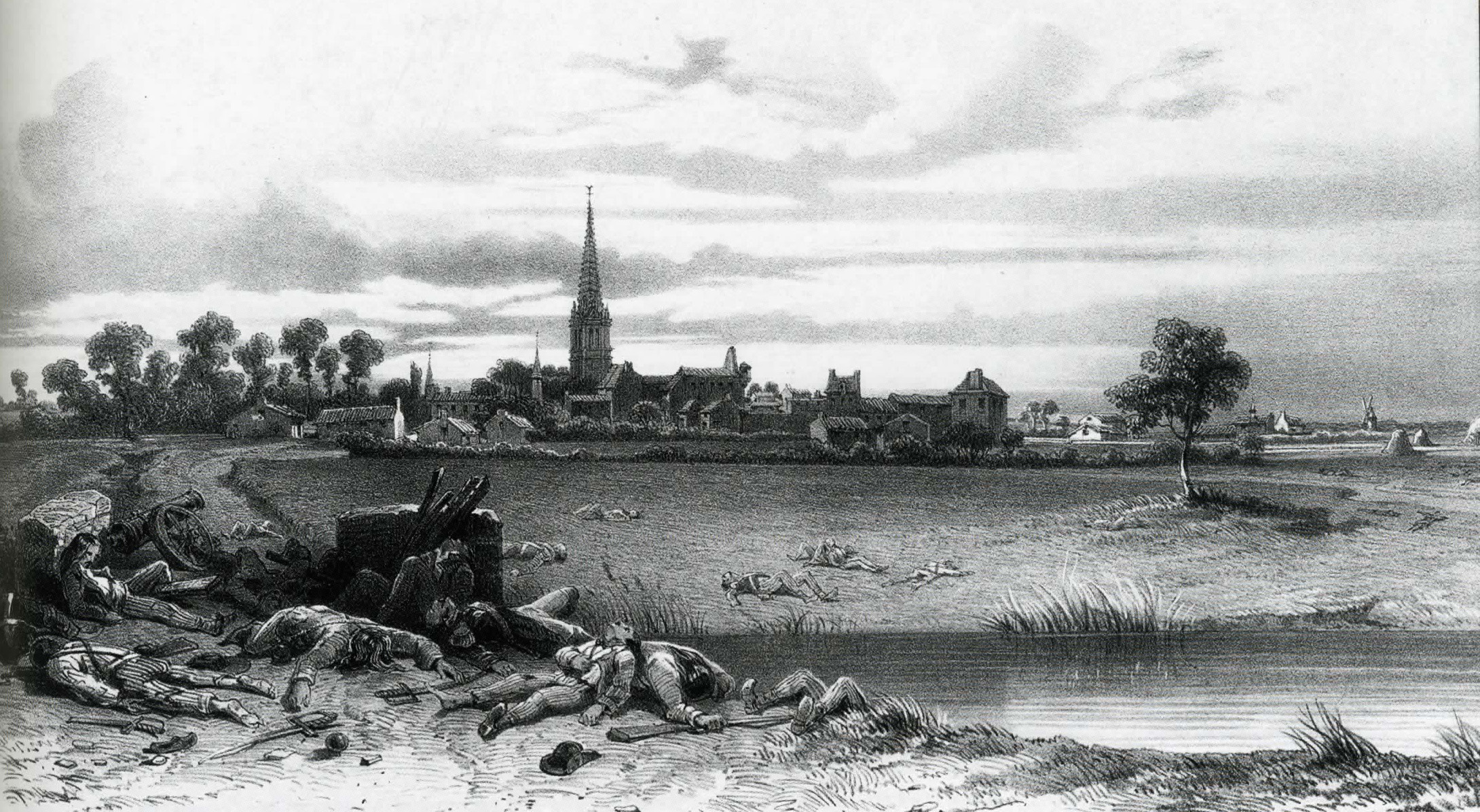
19th century representation of the Battle of Luçon

After the debacle at Chantonnay, Tuncq was removed from his command, probably due to a long-standing dispute with the commanding officer Jean Antoine Rossignol and Lecomte confirmed in his command. Barely recovered, he resumed his place in the army, and was proposed for the rank of major general on 8 October 1793 by the local representatives on mission.

On 11 October at the Second Battle of Châtillon he was again wounded. Carried by soldiers to Bressuire, he died 15 October 1793 as a result of his injury.
