= Battle of Chemillé (April 11, 1793) =

1793 battle of the War in the Vendée

- Part of the War in the Vendée
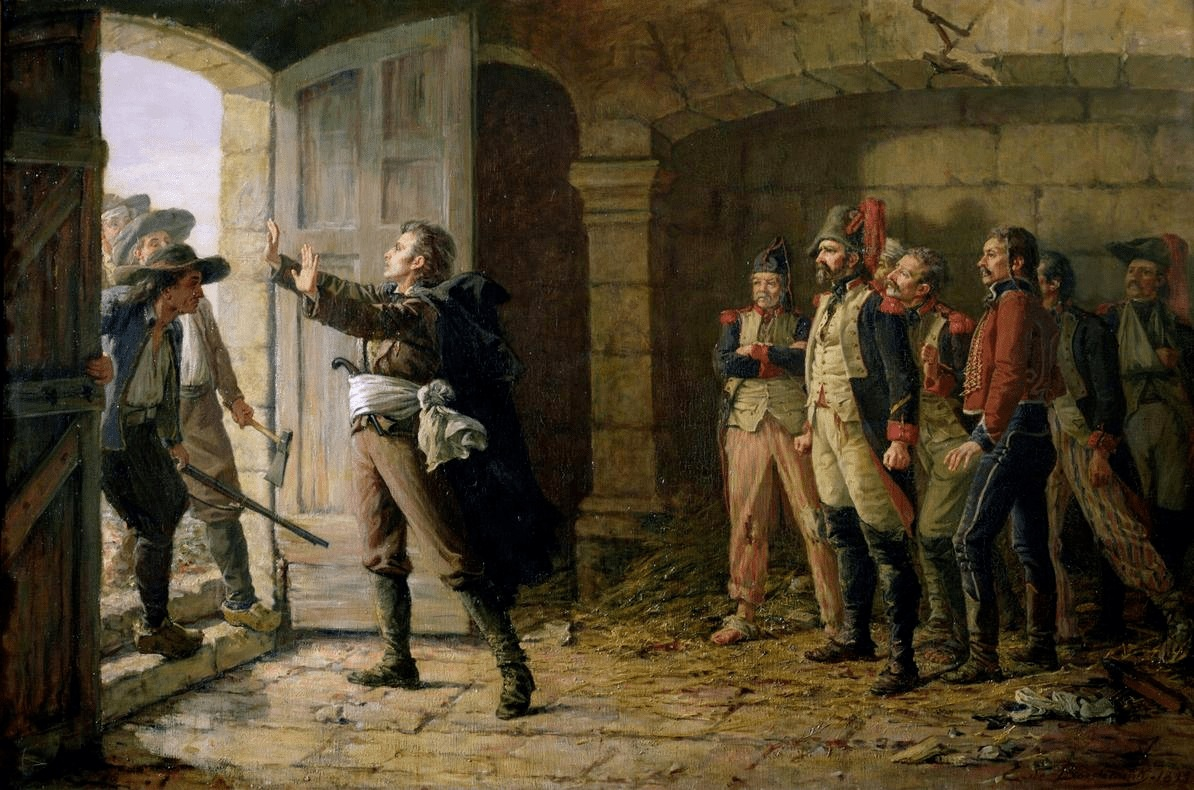
- Maurice d'Elbée protecting Republican prisoners after the battle
Date	11 April 1793
Location	Chemillé, France 47°12′47″N 0°43′33″W
Result	Vendéen victory

Belligerents
French First Republic	Vendéens

Commanders and leaders
Jean-François Berruyer; Charles François Duhoux; Jacques-François Menou	Maurice d'Elbée; Jacques Cathelineau; Jean Perdriau †

Units involved
4,000 men	6,000 men

Casualties and losses
15 killed 60 wounded 400 captured	200–300 killed or wounded 5–6 cannons captured
- Location within France

The Battle of Chemillé, also referred to as the Clash of Chemillé, occurred on April 11, 1793, during the War in the Vendée (1793–1796). The Vendéens emerged triumphant, repelling the Republicans' assault on the town of Chemillé.

== Prelude ==
On April 9, 1793, representatives on mission, Choudieu and Richard, ordered General Jean-François Berruyer, the commander of the Republican forces in Angers, to launch an offensive against the insurgent territories. Despite his initial reluctance, due to his belief that the troops under his command were not yet numerous enough, Berruyer complied.

On April 10, the troops from Angers commenced their journey, divided into three corps. The initial contingent, under the command of Gauvilliers and comprising 4,000 soldiers, was tasked with following the Loire. The second contingent, which was directly commanded by Berruyer and Duhoux de Hauterive, also consisted of 4,000 men and set off from Saint-Lambert-du-Lattay, marching towards Chemillé. The third corps, under the command of Leigonyer and comprising between 5,000 and 8,000 men, was tasked with capturing Coron and Vezins. Additionally, Quétineau's 3,000-strong force stationed at Bressuire was ordered to advance on Les Aubiers, to threaten the Vendéens on their right flank.

Berruyer divided his corps into two columns. The first, commanded by himself and seconded by Menou and Mangin, was to attack Chemillé directly from the north. The second, commanded by Duhoux, passed through La Jumellière, where they routed a post of 600 to 700 Vendéens. On the way, the Republican soldiers burned a village and massacred several inhabitants at Pont-Barré.

== The battle ==
On April 11 at noon, troops under the command of Berruyer arrived in front of Chemillé. The Vendéens, under the command of Maurice d'Elbée and Jacques Cathelineau, had established their position along the main road and behind the Hyrome River. The insurgents had fortified the small town. All the bridges crossing the river had been destroyed, and a trench and a redoubt, armed with cannons, had been constructed to cut off the main road from Angers. Additionally, the Saint-Pierre Church had been crenelated: it was surrounded by an earthen embankment, and loopholes had been cut into the walls.

Berruyer designated Menou as the commanding officer for the right flank, while he assumed the role of the commanding officer for the left flank. Subsequently, the Republicans initiated an offensive maneuver and crossed the river. In the center, the gendarmes of the 35th Division initially succeeded in capturing an artillery battery. However, the assault was eventually repelled, and the demoralized volunteers were compelled to retreat across the Hyrome. However, Duhoux's forces arrived as reinforcements to support Menou. A new assault was launched, and this time the Republicans were successful in pushing back the Vendéen lines, capturing the fortifications, and taking position in the Saint-Pierre Church square. Five cannons were seized, one of which was spiked and thrown into the river. As night fell, the town became the scene of confused hand-to-hand combat.

The prisoners of war, who had been bound together and placed in the front line as human shields, exploited the prevailing chaos to flee towards the lines held by the Republicans. However, in the absence of sufficient light, volunteers misinterpreted this movement as an enemy attack and fled. In the Saint-Pierre square, combatants entrenched in the church persisted in their resistance, and one insurgent detonated a munitions cache, further intensifying the Patriots' panic. D'Elbée, observing the disorder in the Republican ranks, initiated a counterattack. Ultimately, General Berruyer ordered a retreat and withdrew to Saint-Lambert-du-Lattay, where he arrived at midnight.

By the evening of April 11, Chemillé remained under the control of the Vendéens. The battle, which lasted approximately ten hours, concluded with the Vendéens maintaining their hold on the town.

== Casualties ==
Following the cessation of hostilities, General Berruyer and Representative Choudieu posited that the insurgents had sustained approximately 600 casualties. On April 13, Representative Richard, acting on behalf of the commissioners of the Convention, presented a report on the battle in the departments of Maine-et-Loire and Sarthe. The report indicated that 15 Republican soldiers had been killed, while the insurgents had lost between 500 and 600 men. Additionally, 133 Patriots were freed, and six cannons were captured. (Note: It has been a long time since we have informed you of the situation in the department. We were waiting for the first results of the operations that were being prepared. On the 11th, General Berruyer attacked the brigands on all the points they occupied with the different divisions of his army. Leygonnier, at the head of the corps stationed at Yihiers, advanced on Coron, where the enemy was entrenched. He captured it after an intense resistance and drove the rebels back half a league beyond this town. The battle resumed, and they were completely defeated. The Finistère battalion and the 19th dragoons particularly distinguished themselves. Citizen Gauvilliers, commanding the corps on the right bank of the Loire, crossed the river; he attacked the brigands at Meuil, routed them, seized their artillery, and then entered Saint-Florent, an important post that was feared could not be taken without losing many citizens. The activity of Citizen Gauvilliers and the enthusiasm of the troops under his command prevented this misfortune for the Republic. General Berruyer advanced on Chemillé and La Jumellière, where the enemy had gathered their greatest forces. They were strongly entrenched on all points. After a very intense cannonade, this position was also taken by the battalion of the 35th Gendarmerie Division and some National Guards. Six cannons were taken. If night had not fallen, the brigands would have been clandestinely pursued. In this affair, we killed 5 to 600 brigands; we lost 15 men; more were wounded. We freed 133 patriot prisoners whom the enemies had tied up next to their batteries. The 35th Gendarmerie Division behaved with the greatest bravery; if it had been supported by the majority of the National Guards, the affair would not have lasted long. We can only praise the conduct of General-in-Chief Berruyer and Generals Du Houx and Menou. Du Houx was slightly wounded in the leg, and Menou advanced on foot with a detachment of the 35th Division to a cannon, which he captured with a sword in hand. We lost the mounted gendarmerie captain Marchand and Adjutant-General Mangin. The general will continue to hunt down the rebels. If he had three or four battalions of trained troops, this expedition would have been promptly concluded and begun several weeks ago. We will report exactly on the following events. The National Convention sent the representatives to the departments of Maine-et-Loire and Sarthe. — Letter signed by the representative Richard) Refractory priest Jacques Cantiteau claimed to have seen in "official papers" that 1,500 Republicans had been neutralized at Chemillé, but this figure is likely an exaggeration. In 1840, military historian Patu-Deschautschamps provided a revised tally, noting 15 Republicans killed, including two officers, and 60 wounded. He reported that the Vendéens suffered losses estimated between 200 and 300 men. Patu-Deschautschamps also confirmed the liberation of 133 prisoners and the capture of five cannons by the Republicans.

Moreover, approximately 400 members of the Republican Party were captured.

A 2007 study by Manuel Jobar revealed that insurgents from Chemillé experienced significant losses, with approximately 10% of the 602 recorded insurgents being killed during the battle.

Among the casualties of the battle were the Republican Adjutant-General Mangin and the Vendéen leader Jean Perdriau. General Charles Duhoux de Hauterive was wounded in the leg.

== D'Elbée's Pater Noster ==
Following the conclusion of hostilities, combatants from Vendée assembled in front of Chemillé's church, demanding the execution of the Republican prisoners detained there. General d'Elbée arrived on the scene amidst the assembled crowd, attempting to pacify the situation. At his behest, the men assumed a kneeling posture and eventually asked them to recite the Pater Noster, which they did. However, when they reached the words "forgive us our trespasses as we forgive those who trespass against us", d'Elbée interrupted them, stating, "Stop! Do not lie to God! You dare ask Him to forgive you as you forgive others while you are ready to take revenge on your enemies!" These words provoked no protest, and the prisoners were thus spared. This episode became known as "Le Pater d'Elbée" (d'Elbée's Pater Noster").

== Aftermath ==
In his April 12 report, General Berruyer expressed discontent with the conduct of the volunteers, accusing them of cowardice. Furthermore, he expressed concern about the inadequate provisions and equipment available to the volunteers, stating, "I must reiterate that I cannot rely on the volunteers' capabilities. The majority of them are equipped with substandard hunting rifles, lacking even the basic addition of a bayonet. Additionally, only a small fraction possess a fundamental understanding of weaponry. If I were to have at my disposal four battalions comparable to the 35th Gendarmerie Division, I would be confident in achieving success. However, I will continue to emphasize the critical necessity of putting an end to the disturbances currently plaguing this country."

The Vendéens' triumph at Chemillé proved to be ephemeral. On the same day, Bonchamps was vanquished by Gauvilliers at Le Mesnil-en-Vallée, while Stofflet was repelled at Coron by Leigonyer. Facing threats on their flanks and rapidly depleting ammunition supplies, D'Elbée and Cathelineau were compelled to initiate a strategic withdrawal. By the evening of April 12, all Angevin forces had regrouped at Beaupréau. According to Bonchamps' counsel, the Vendéen leaders resolved to withdraw to Tiffauges. On April 13, Berruyer's forces occupied Chemillé. Subsequently, on April 17, Cholet was recaptured by the Republicans. However, Berruyer erred in failing to pursue the Anjou army. Preoccupied with the condition of his troops, he was unaware that the insurgents were in an even more disadvantageous position.

== Bibliography ==
- Carné, Gaston Louis Michel Marie baron (1893). Revue historique de l'Ouest (in French). Vol. IX. Bureaux de la Revue.
- Coutau-Bégarie, Hervé; Doré-Graslin, Charles (2010). ""Cette guerre extraordinaire et inexplicable" : La dimensension militaire des guerres de Vendée". Histoire militaire des guerres de Vendée (in French). Economica.
- Graslin, Philbert Doré (1979). Itinéraires de la Vendée militaire : journal de la Guerre des Géants : 1793-1801 (in French). Éditions Garnier Frères.
- Gabory, Émile (2009). Les guerres de Vendée. bouquins (in French). Paris: Éditions Robert Laffont. ISBN 978-2-221-11309-7.
- Gérard, Alain (2001). Les Vendéens des origines à nos jours (in French). La Roche-sur-Yon: Centre vendéen de recherches historiques. ISBN 978-2911253126.
- Gras, Yves (1994). La guerre de Vendée : 1793-1796. Campagnes et stratégies (in French). Paris: Economica. ISBN 978-2-7178-2600-5.
- Hussenet, Jacques (2007). "Détruisez la Vendée !". Regards croisés sur les victimes et destructions de la guerre de Vendée (in French). La Roche-sur-Yon: Centre vendéen de recherches historiques.
- Loidreau, Simone (2010). "Saumur, 9 juin 1793. La grande occasion manquée". Histoire militaire des guerres de Vendée (in French). Economica.
- Martin, Jean-Clément (2014). La guerre de Vendée 1793-1800 (in French). Éditions Points.
- Muraise, Éric (2010). "L'insurrection royaliste dans l'Ouest (1791-1800)". Histoire militaire des guerres de Vendée (in French). Economica.
- Patu-Deschautschamps, F. L (1840). Dix années de guerre intestine : présentant le tableau et l'examen raisonné des opérations des armées royalistes et républicaines dans les départements de l'ouest, depuis le mois de mars, 1793 jusqu'au Ier août 1802 (in French). Gaultier-Laguionie. Archived from the original on September 3, 2024.
- Savary, Jean Julien (1824). Guerres des Vendéens et des Chouans contre la République (in French). Vol. I. Paris: Baudoin Frères, Libraires-éditeurs. Archived from the original on February 6, 2021.
- Siraudeau, J (1921). L'Anjou historique (in French). Vol. 21–22.
- Tabeur, Jean (2008). Paris contre la province : les guerres de l'ouest, 1792-1796. Campagnes & stratégies / Les grandes batailles (in French). Vol. 70. Paris: Economica. ISBN 978-2-7178-5641-5.
- Walter, Gérard (1953). La Guerre de Vendée (in French). Plon.
