= Battle of Coron (1793) =

Coordinates: 47°07′42″N 0°38′35″W

- Part of the War in the Vendée
Date	18 September 1793
Location	Coron, Maine-et-Loire, France
Result	Vendean victory

Belligerents
(Kingdom of France) French Royalists	Republican France

Commanders and leaders
(Kingdom of France) Louis de Lescure (Kingdom of France) Dominique Piron	(France) Jean Rossignol (France) Antoine Santerre

Units involved
(Kingdom of France) Catholic and Royal Army	(France) Army of the Coasts of La Rochelle

Strength
12,000, 3 guns	17,000, 24 guns

Casualties and losses
?	24 guns

The Battle of Coron (18 September 1793) was fought between Royalist and Republican French forces near Coron during the War in the Vendée. A Republican division from Saumur led by Antoine Joseph Santerre beat Royalist Vendeans at Doué-la-Fontaine on 15 September and at Vihiers on the 17th. However, on 18 September Santerre's division blundered into an ambush between Vihiers and Coron set by Louis Marie de Lescure and Dominique Piron. The Republican column was routed and lost all its artillery. A few days later, a flanking Republican division under Charles François Duhoux was beaten in the Battle of Pont-Barré. In mid-September the Republican Army of the Coasts of La Rochelle under Jean Antoine Rossignol advanced into the Vendée from the south and east at the same time as the Army of the Coasts of Brest and the Army of Mainz commanded by Jean Baptiste Camille Canclaux marched in from the west. In battles at Coron, Pont-Barré, Tiffauges, Montaigu and Saint-Fulgent, the Vendean rebels massed against and defeated each Republican invading column.
