= Battle of Luçon =

1793 battle of the French Revolutionary Wars

Coordinates: 46.4556°N 1.1647°W

Battle of Luçon (1793)
- Part of the War in the Vendée
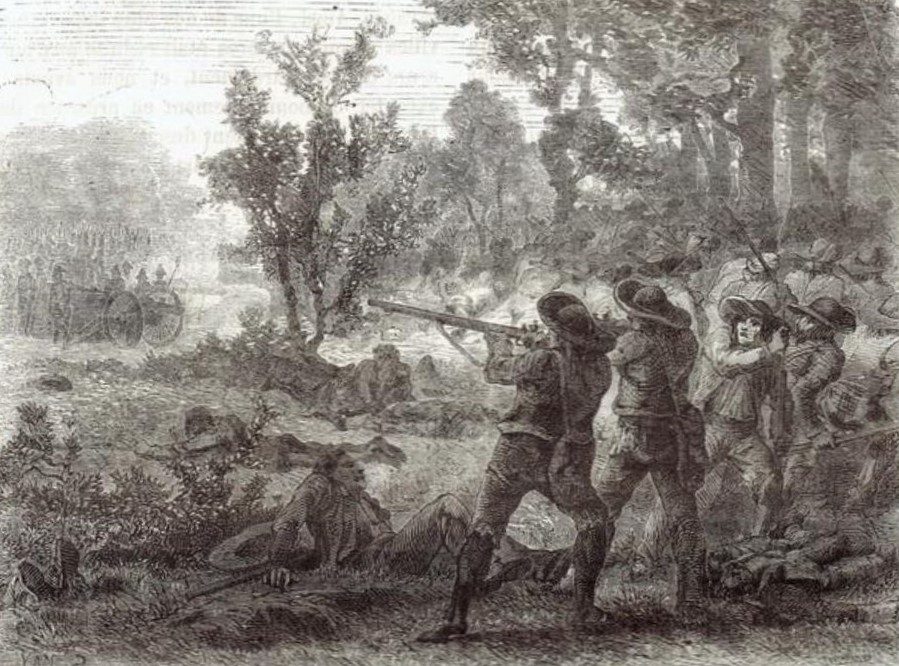
- 19th century representation of the battle by illustrator Yan' Dargent, 1866.
| Date | 14 August 1793 |
| Location | Vendée, France |
| Result | French Republican victory |

Belligerents
| (France) French Republic | French Royalists |

Commanders and leaders
| (France) Augustin Tuncq | Maurice d'Elbée; Marquis de Lescure; Prince de Talmont; Henri du Vergier; François de Charette; Gaspard de Marigny |

Units involved
| (France) French Revolutionary Army: Army of the Coasts of La Rochelle | Catholic and Royal Army: Armée catholique et royale d'Anjou |

Strength
| 10,000; 14 cannons | 35,000; 17 cannons |

Casualties and losses
| Total: c. 500: 100 dead; 400 wounded | Total: c. 5,000 to 6,000: 1,500 to 2,000 dead; 4,000 wounded; 17 cannons lost |

The final Battle of Luçon was fought on 14 August 1793 during the French Revolutionary Wars, between forces of the French Republic under Augustin Tuncq and Royalist forces under Maurice d'Elbée. The engagement on 14 August, fought near the town of Luçon in Vendée, France, was actually the conclusion of three engagements between the Vendean insurgents and the Republican French. On 15 July, Claude Sandoz and a garrison of 800 had repulsed 5,000 insurgents led by d'Elbee. On 28 July, Augustin Tuncq drove off a second attempt. Two weeks later, Tunq and his 10,000 men routed 30,000 insurgents under the personal command of Francois-Athanese Charette.

== Background ==
After the defeat at the Second Battle of Luçon, the Vendée general staff met at the Château de La Boulaye in Châtillon-sur-Sèvre. An emissary, Vincent de Tinténiac, a former member of the Breton Association, presented himself to the Vendée people bearing letters written by Henry Dundas. This was the first contact made by the British government with the Vendée people. In this letter, Henry Dundas asked the Vendée people to cross the Loire and take a port on the coast of northern Brittany, so that he could land troops. He also asked to know the plans and objectives of the Vendée people, as well as the forces at their disposal. Tinténiac then left for Great Britain with the response of the Vendée people, who asked the Count of Provence and the Count of Artois to land in the West at the head of soldiers from the Army of the Emigrants.

However, the Vendée officers were divided over the next steps. Bonchamps and Talmont were in favour of the English plan. On the other hand, General-in-Chief Maurice d'Elbée, supported by Louis de Lescure, believed that after the defeat at Nantes, a new attempt to cross north of the Loire seemed too difficult. He judged that the army needed gunpowder and munitions and that the towns in the south of the Vendée seemed more vulnerable. He then decided to march on Luçon.

D'Elbée, at the head of the Grande Armée, also called on the Army of the Centre and the Army of Haut-Poitou, commanded respectively by Royrand and Charette. The three forces met at Chantonnay, then marched on Luçon, while Charles de Bonchamps remained in the north to protect Anjou.

In Luçon, General Augustin Tuncq had recently been dismissed by General Rossignol, the commander-in-chief of the coastal army of La Rochelle, for having accused him of incompetence. However, on 13 August, the Republicans learned that the Vendéens were marching on Luçon. Therefore, the representatives on mission Jean François Goupilleau de Fontenay and François Louis Bourdon decided to keep Tuncq in command and charged him with repelling the Vendéens.

== Battle ==
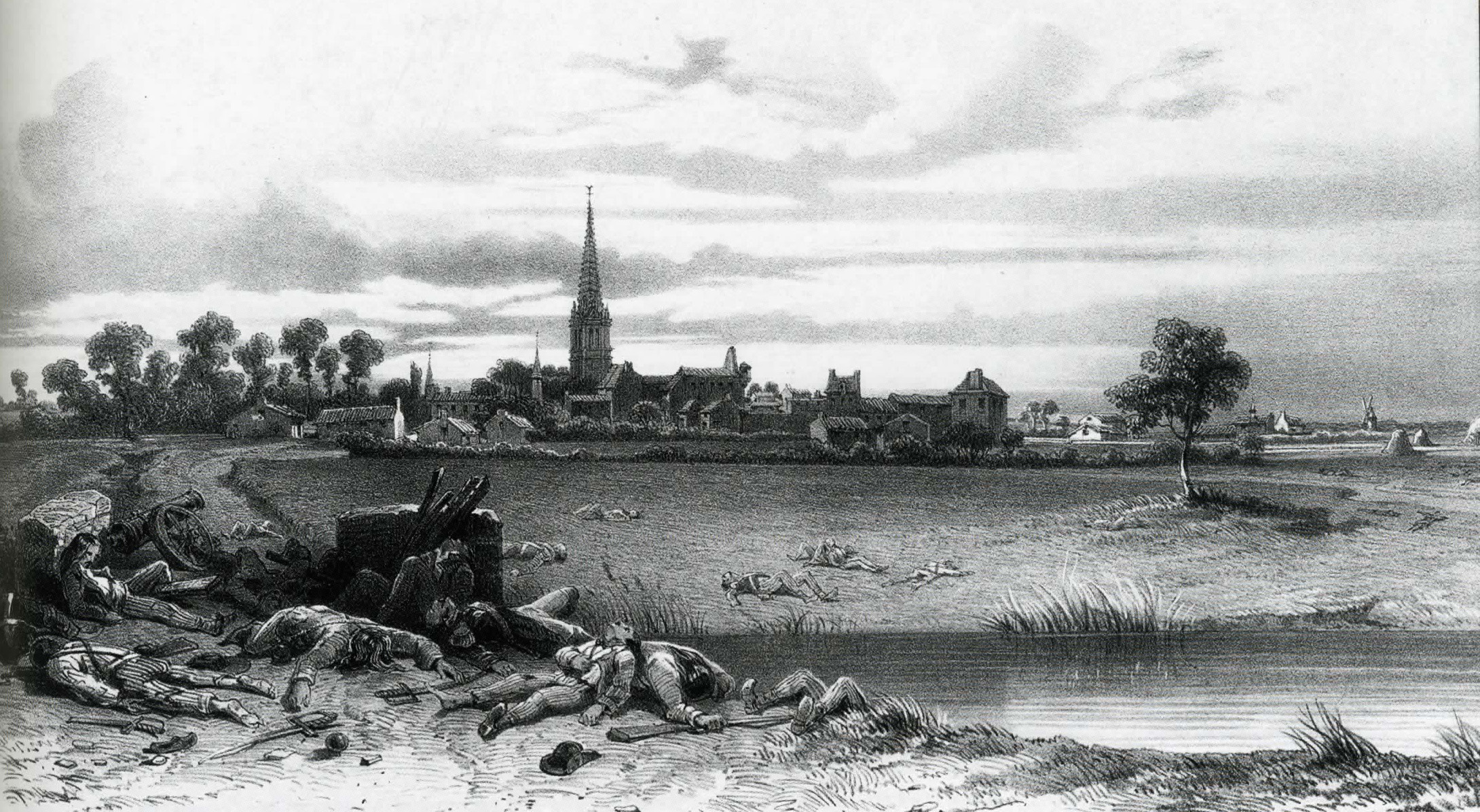
The defeat of the Vendeans before Luçon, engraving by Tom Drake.

It was at the Auberge du Bon Pasteur, in Sainte-Hermine, that the Vendée generals gathered to prepare the plan of attack on the town of Luçon. Charette is said to have said this bold phrase: "I can take the town alone."

On August 14, at 5 a.m., the Vendéens were in front of Luçon. General Maurice d'Elbée, Royrand and La Rochejaquelein occupied the left flank, Lescure and Marigny the center, Charette and Joly the right flank. The plan of attack had been established by Lescure: it was a question of launching several attacks at different levels.

Augustin Tuncq deployed his troops on the plain north of the city. Although they were already greatly outnumbered, he tried to make the Vendéens believe that his forces were even more inferior. He hid his artillery in the center, behind a battalion, while other soldiers lay on the ground.

When the Vendéens attacked, the Republican infantry opened fire, then retreated to the town. The Republican artillery also opened fire in turn, causing heavy losses to the Vendéens on the plain and slowing their advance. Great confusion and a lack of coordination then began to reign in the Vendéens ranks. On the right flank, Charette, spared from artillery fire, advanced much faster than the rest of the army. Talmont 's cavalry became entangled in Marigny 's artillery. On the left flank, La Rochejaquelein lost his way. D'Elbée redeployed to the center, in order to support Royrand. Tuncq then launched the counterattack: he abandoned Charette and attacked the center. The Vendéens panicked and fled, pursued by the Republican cavalry. Isolated, Charette retreated to avoid finding himself fighting all the Republican forces.

== Losses ==
The Vendéens fled to Chantonnay, leaving many dead on the field, including Baudry d'Asson. Their losses are estimated at 5,000 to 6,000 according to the many academic sources. According to the memoirs of Victoire de Donnissan de La Rochejaquelein, the Vendéens lost 1,500 men in this battle, which was then the most disastrous of all those that had taken place until then. According to the memoirs of Bertrand Poirier de Beauvais, estimates the losses at 5,000 killed and wounded at most. He wrote: "Our losses were considerable, and this day alone cost us more than all the fighting sustained until then."

== Consequences ==
The Vendéen leaders met at Chantonnay, but they blamed each other for the defeat. Maurice d'Elbée blamed the rout on Lescure's plan, who replied to Maurice d'Elbée that he had approved it. Charette criticized the Anjou army for abandoning the battlefield. Officers of the Anjou army also criticized Royrand for enlisting Protestant parishes suspected of republican sympathies, which would have aggravated the rout. Finally, the leaders parted ways bitterly.

After having repelled the Vendéens twice at Luçon, General Augustin Tuncq was praised for his command and promoted to the rank of Divisional general.
