= François-Xavier Babineau =

François-Xavier Babineau (21 March 1825 – 16 April 1890) was a Canadian Catholic priest, and the first New Brunswick-born Acadian to become a Catholic priest.

Babineau was born the son of prosperous farmers in New Brunswick. He received his early education locally and then studied at Sainte-Anne-de-la-Pocatière in Canada East. He pursued further studies for the priesthood at Quebec City, and was ordained in 1851 by Bishop Charles-François Baillargeon.

Babineau returned to his home province to minister and served in a number of parishes. In 1859 at Cap-Pelé, he singlehandedly saw a number of his parishioners through a smallpox epidemic.

In 1864, François-Xavier became the first resident priest for Cap-Pelé and, over a number of years, ministered there and at Buctouche, New Brunswick. In 1878, being unhappy with his postings, he left the ministry. In 1881, he obtained a teaching certificate and finished his life in that capacity.
