= Battle of Vihiers =

Coordinates: 47°08′50″N 0°31′57″W

- Part of the War in the Vendée
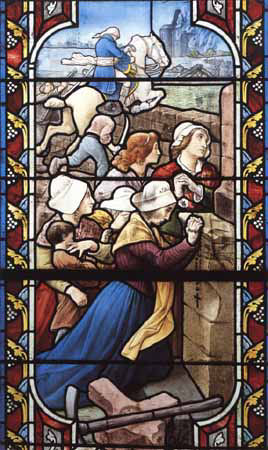
- Women pray as Republican general Antoine Santerre jumps his horse over a wall to flee.
Date	18 July 1793
Location	Vihiers, Maine-et-Loire, France
Result	Vendean victory

Belligerents
(Kingdom of France) French Royalists	Republican France

Commanders and leaders
(Kingdom of France) Dominique Piron	(France) Jacques La Barolière (France) Jacques Menou (France) Louis Berthier (France) Louis-Nicolas Davout

Units involved
(Kingdom of France) Catholic and Royal Army	(France) Army of the Coasts of La Rochelle

Strength
12,000 men	14,000 men, 30 guns

Casualties and losses
1,000	5,000, 25 guns

The Battle of Vihiers (18 July 1793) was a battle between Royalist and Republican French forces at Vihiers during the War in the Vendée. After the Republican division under Jacques-Marie Pilote La Barolière advanced into the heart of the revolt area, it was attacked by the Vendeans under Dominique Piron de La Vienne and routed. The advance guard under Jacques-François Menou held its ground for a long time, but many Republican units from the main body quickly took to their heels. The Republican cavalry under Louis-Nicolas Davout covered the disorderly retreat. The Royalists suffered about 1,000 killed and wounded but inflicted 2,000 killed and wounded on their enemies as well as capturing 3,000 soldiers and 25 artillery pieces.
