= François-Xavier de Peretti =

French politician

François-Xavier de Peretti is a French politician and a member of the MoDem. He is an opposition municipal councillor in Aix-en-Provence.

In 2009, he was selected to be the MoDem's candidate in Provence-Alpes-Côte d'Azur for the 2010 regional elections.

Today , he is a French philosophy and Moral and Civic Education teacher

== See also ==
- Politics of France
