= François-Xavier Audouin =

French clergyman and politician (1765–1837)

- Born: 18 April 1765; Limoges, Haute-Vienne
- Died: 23 July 1837 (aged 72); Paris
- Occupations: clergyman, writer, politician

François-Xavier Audouin (18 April 1765 – 23 July 1837), commonly called Xavier Audouin, was a French clergyman and politician during the French Revolution. He was a member of the Jacobin Club, in which he frequently made speeches. He was a parish priest in Limoges before the outbreak of the French Revolution.

== Biography ==
Born in 1765 into an old bourgeois family in Limoges, Xavier Audouin was the son of a master tanner. He was a parish priest in Limoges before the outbreak of the French Revolution. He took an active part during the Revolution, and was secretary of the Paris Jacobins.

On 15 January 1793, Audouin married Marie-Sylvie Pache, the daughter of Jean-Nicolas Pache, and the witnesses at the wedding were Antoine Joseph Santerre and Jacques Hébert.

== Works ==
- Inside the Prison. Chez Pougin. 1795.
- Freedom of the Press. Chez l'auteur. 1796.
- Maritime Commerce. Baudouin. 1800.
- A History of the Progress of the Art of War. P. Didot. 1811.
- Responsibilities of Ministers. Brissot-Thivars. 1819.
