= Amailloux =

- Commune
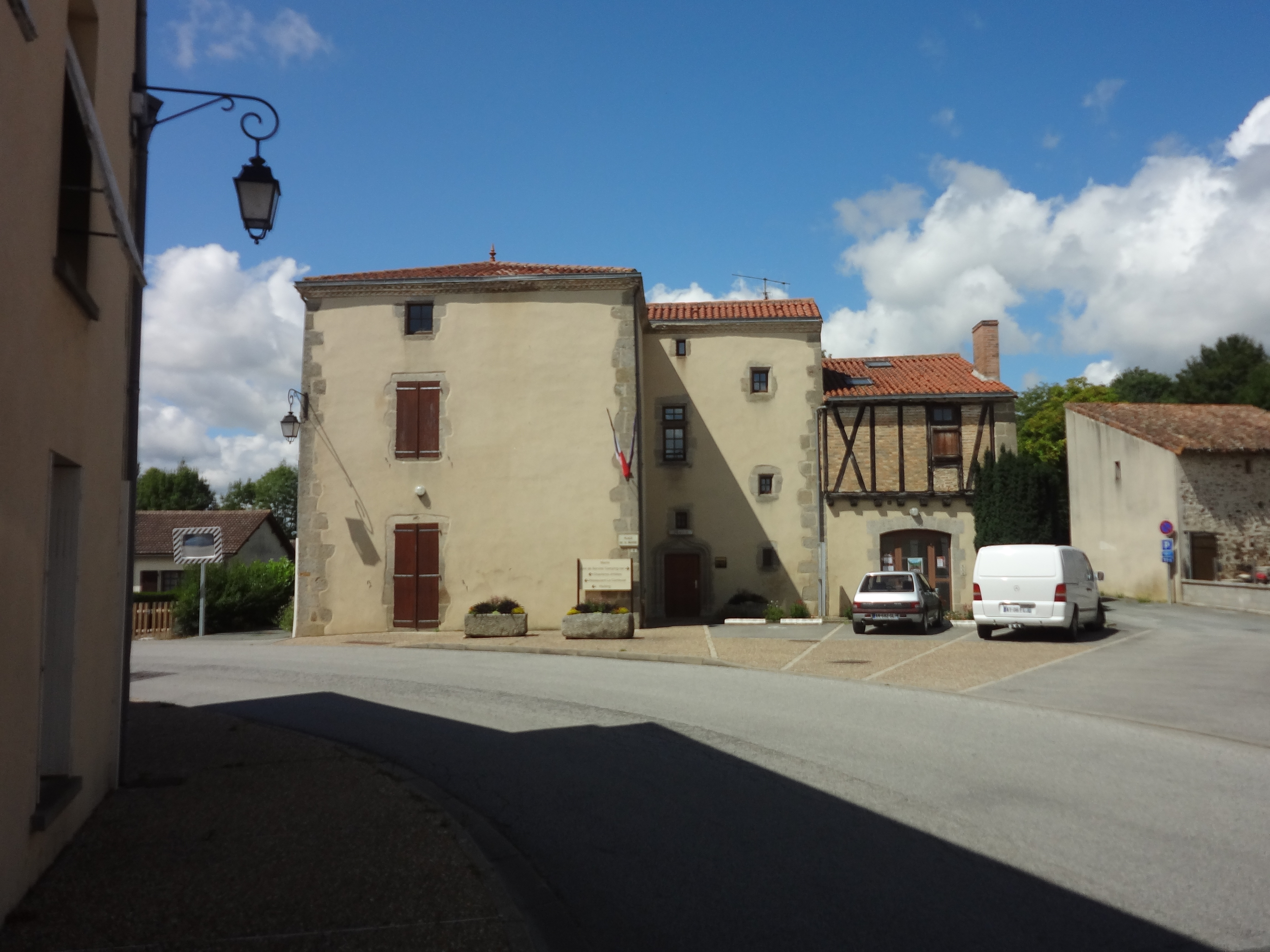
- The town hall in Amailloux
- Location of Amailloux
- Location within France Location within Nouvelle-Aquitaine
- Coordinates: 46°44′48″N 0°19′03″W
- Country: France
- Region: Nouvelle-Aquitaine
- Department: Deux-Sèvres
- Arrondissement: Parthenay
- Canton: Parthenay
- Intercommunality: CC Parthenay-Gâtine

Government
  - Mayor (2020–2026): Nathalie Brescia
- Area^{1}: 37 km^{2} (14 sq mi)
- Population (2023): 822
  - Density: 22/km^{2} (58/sq mi)
- Time zone: UTC+01:00 (CET)
  - Summer (DST): UTC+02:00 (CEST)
- INSEE/Postal code: 79008 /
- ^{1} French Land Register data, which excludes lakes, ponds, glaciers > 1 km^{2} (0.386 sq mi or 247 acres) and river estuaries.

Amailloux (French pronunciation: [amaju]) is a commune in the Deux-Sèvres department in the Nouvelle-Aquitaine region in western France. It is situated about 14 km (8.7 mi) northwest of the town of Parthenay.

== See also ==
- Communes of the Deux-Sèvres department
