= Maurice d'Elbée =

French Royalist military leader (1752–1794)

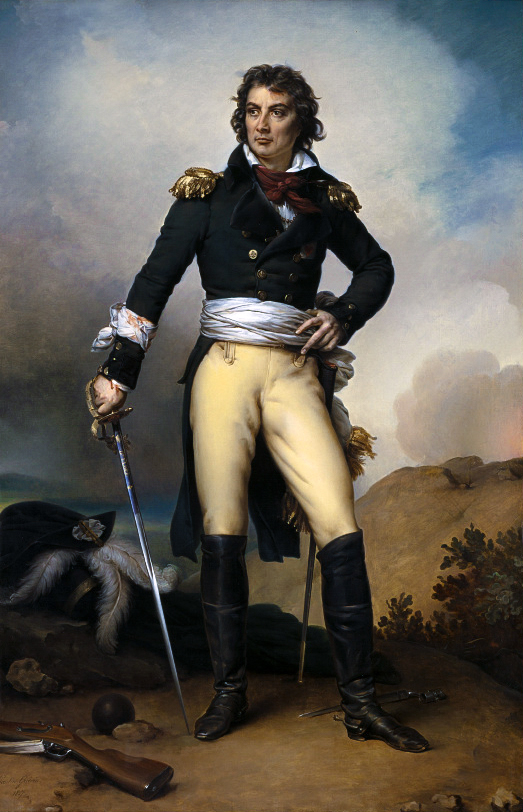
- Portrait by Jean-Baptiste Paulin Guérin, 1827
- Born: 21 March 1752; Dresden, Electorate of Saxony
- Died: 6 January 1794 (aged 41); Noirmoutier, French First Republic
- Military career
- Allegiance: Kingdom of France; Royalist rebels
- Branch: French Royal Army
- Service years: 1777–1783; 1793–1794
- Rank: Major General (France); Generalissimo (Vendée)
- Nickname: General Providence
- Conflicts: War in the Vendée; First Battle of Fontenay-le-Comte; Battle of Saumur; Battle of Nantes; Battle of Luçon; Battle of Tiffauges; Battle of La Tremblaye; Battle of Cholet; Battle of Noirmoutier †

Maurice-Joseph-Louis Gigost d'Elbée (French: [mɔʁis ʒiɡo dɛlbe]; 21 March 1752 – 6 January 1794) was a French Royalist military leader. Initially enthusiastic about the Revolution, he became disenchanted with the Civil Constitution of the Clergy and retired to his estates in Beaupréau. He was the second commander in chief of the Catholic and Royal Army formed by Royalist forces of the Vendean insurrection against the Republic.

== Life ==
Maurice d'Elbee was born in Dresden, Electorate of Saxony to a French family in 1752. He moved to France in 1777, becoming a naturalised citizen and joining the French Royal Army. He embarked on a military career, reaching the rank of lieutenant, but resigned from the army in 1783 and married, thereafter living a retired country life near Beaupréau in Anjou. He then served as an officer in the army of Frederick Augustus I, the Prince-Elector of Saxony. After the Revolution, he returned in obedience to the law which ordered emigrants to return to France.

=== Participation in the Vendéan Revolt ===
The peasantry and much of the middle class in the Vendée remained loyal to the Catholic Church and, in 1792, the Marquess de la Rouërie had organized a general rising, although this was frustrated by the count's arrest. However, when the Convention decreed the levee en masse of 300,000 men, the Vendée mounted a war against what they considered the atheist Republic. The peasants of Beaupréau to appoint him as their leader. His troop joined those of François de Charette, Charles Bonchamps, Jacques Cathelineau and Jean-Nicolas Stofflet. The army experienced several successes: Stofflet defeated the republican army at Saint-Vincent, in the Battle of Pont-Charrault; d'Elbée and Bonchamps won at Beaupréau; and Henri de la Rochejaquelein won the victories at the Aubiers and First Cholet. He is famous for his actions after the Battle of Chemillé, on 11 April 1793: after the insurgents' victory, many of them planned to avenge their dead and slaughter the Republican prisoners (approx. 400). D'Elbée tried to prevent them, and eventually asked them to recite the Our Father, which they did; then, when they had reached the sentence "And forgive us our trespasses, as we forgive those who have trespassed against us", he interrupted them with the words: "Do not lie to God!". Moved by this reproach, his men turned away, and d'Elbée was able to save the prisoners. This episode has since become known as "Le Pater d'Elbée" (d'Elbée's Pater Noster).

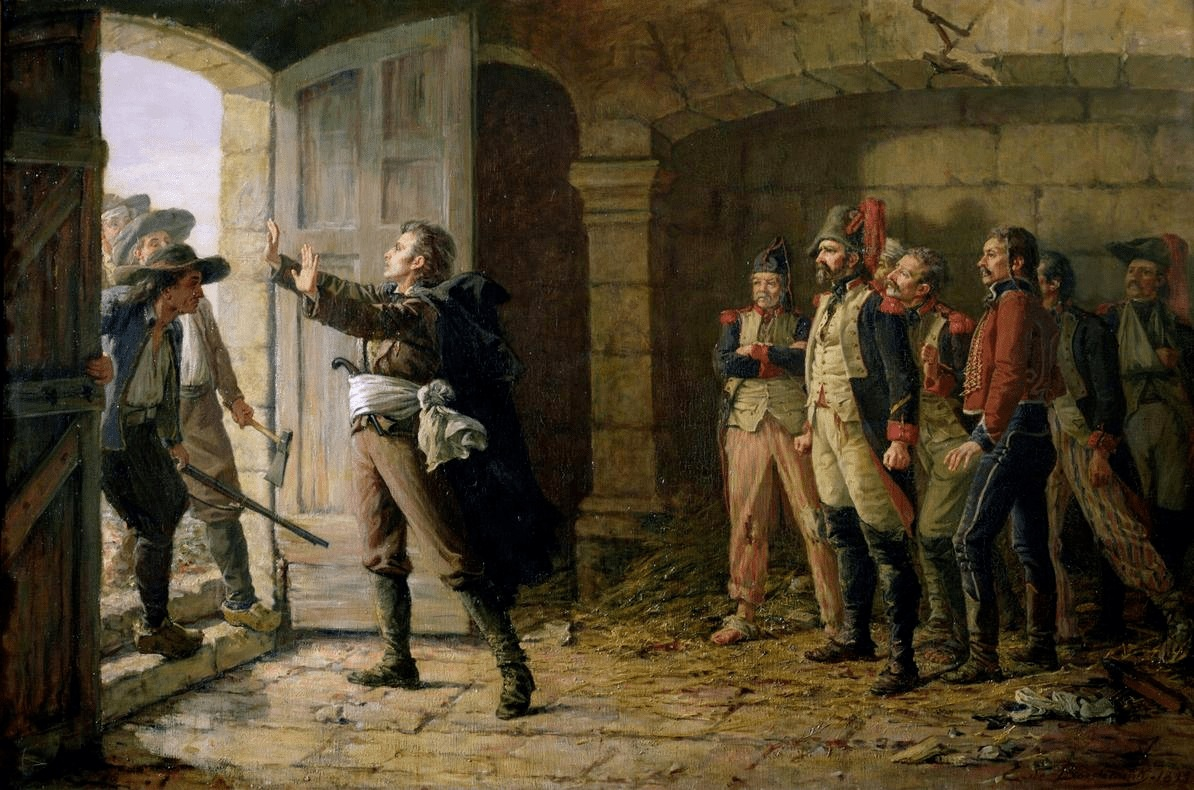
D'Elbée protecting Republican prisoners after the Battle of Chemillé, by Edmond Marie Félix de Boislecomte.

By spring 1793, the insurgents controlled the province of Brittany. On 2 June, La Rochejacquelein stormed Saumur and Cathelineau was elected as commander in chief. D'Elbée was the top deputy of Cathelineau. The eight-year-old Louis XVII held in the Temple prison in Paris, the son of the executed Louis XVI, was proclaimed king of France, and Charette and Cathelineau united their armies to advance upon Nantes. When Cathelineau knelt at the town square to thank God for their victories, he was killed by a Republican sniper on 14 July 1793; d'Elbée replaced him as generalissimo. A skillful general, he led the small Vendéan army to several victories, most notably at Coron and Torfou. Even at his loss at the Battle of Luçon (14 August 1793), he managed to extract his force from danger. At the Battle of Luçon he managed to extricate the Royalist force from a potential rout, but suffered a significant reverse.

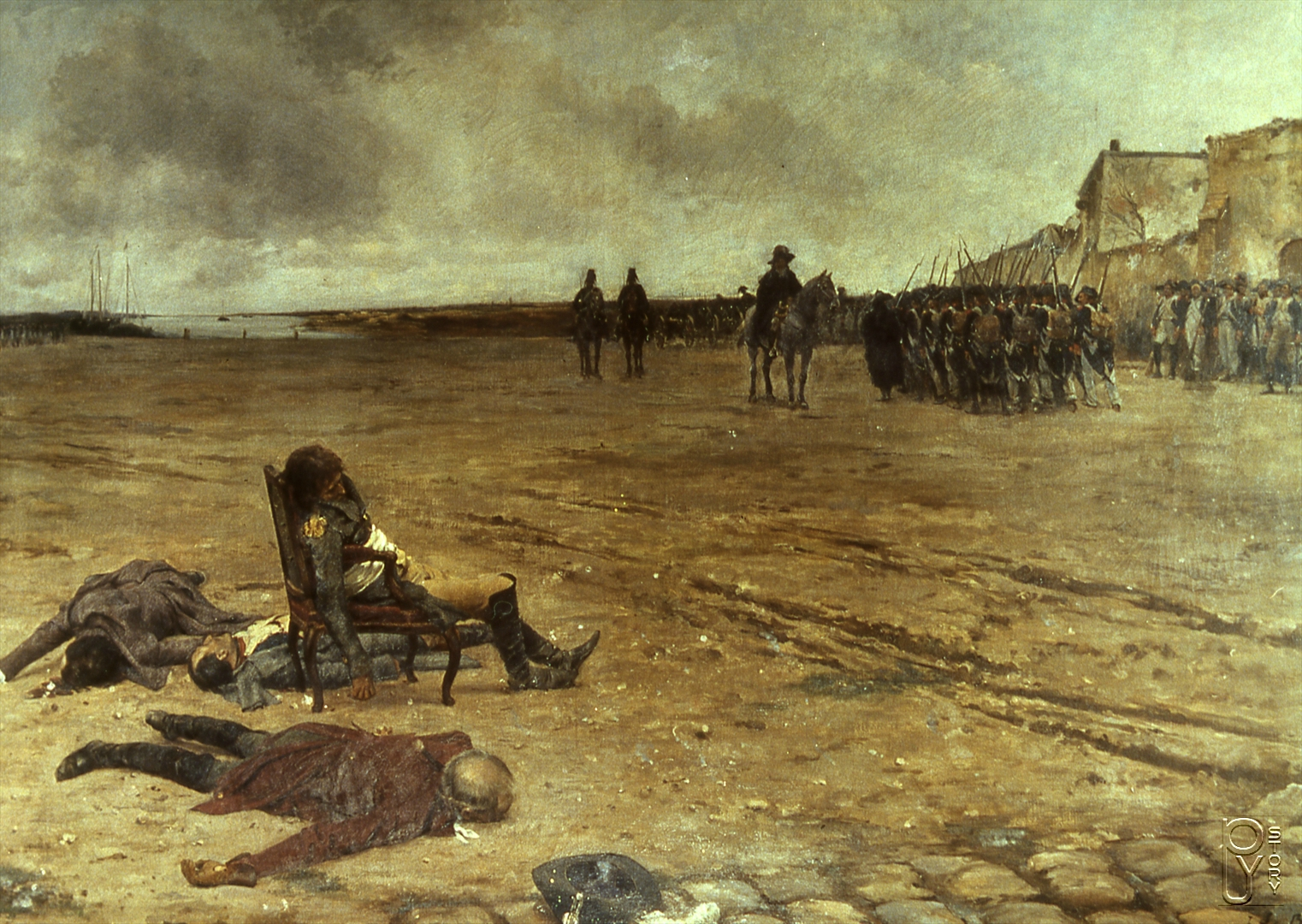
Death of General d'Elbée, by Julien Le Blant.

The Republican government in Paris entrusted its fighting to generals from the old army. François Joseph Westermann was sent against them first, but on 5 July he was driven from Châtillon and suspended by the representatives on mission. After his dismissal, some of the most incompetent generals of the old army sought to defeat the rebellion. He was succeeded by the Duke of Lauzun, General Biron, who was no more successful, and who was dismissed less than a week later; the committee then sent Jean Antoine Rossignol, formerly a goldsmith's apprentice, Antoine Joseph Santerre, a brewer, and Charles-Philippe Ronsin, a playwright; all were beaten in successive battles, although Rossignol managed to hang on to his command.

Eventually, Jean Baptiste Kléber took command of the Republic army in the Vendée and inflicted a series of defeats. Following the Second Battle at Cholet (17 October 1793), he was badly wounded and Bonchamps was killed. Afterwards d'Elbée was transported first to Beaupréau, then the island of Noirmoutier. Three months later, the Republicans took control of the island and brought him before a military commission for a show trial. Condemned to death, he was executed by firing squad in the public square of the town of Noirmoutier. He was shot sitting in a chair, since he was unable to stand due to his fourteen wounds. Rochejaquelein, (1772–1794) a former royal cavalry officer, succeeded him as general of the Vendéan force.

== Personal life ==
He was married to Marguerite Charlotte Holly Hauterive on 17 November 1788 in the Church of the Gaubretière, and therefore lived retired in a country very close to Beaupréau in Anjou. Marguerite d'Elbée was shot twenty days following the execution of her husband in January 1794 and buried in a sunken road. The remains of her body were discovered by chance much later.

His son Louis-Joseph Maurice d'Elbée was born on 12 March 1793. Louis-Joseph Maurice d'Elbée was raised in Beaupréau. He served in the armies of Napoleon, where he distinguished himself in the Battle of Leipzig and the Battle of Hanau. Wounded in Hanau, he was taken prisoner and transported to the Potsdam hospital where he died the following year.

The chair d'Elbée was executed in remained within his family until 1975, when his relative Marquis Charles Maurice d'Elbée donated the chair to the Vendée Museum in the Château de Noirmoutier.
