= Jean-François Berruyer =

French general

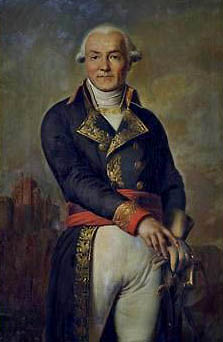
Portrait of Jean-François Berruyer, by Jules Varnier

Jean-François Berruyer (25 October 1741, Lyon - 17 April 1804, Paris) was a French general of the French Revolutionary Wars.

On 1 October 1792, as part of a significant organization of France's armies, he became the 1st Commander of the Army of the Interior, when it first became independent from both the Army of the North and the Army of the Centre.

Over 10 years later, he was also the Commandant then designated as Governor of Les Invalides (1797–1804) on 28 August 1803.
