= Chantonnay =

- Commune
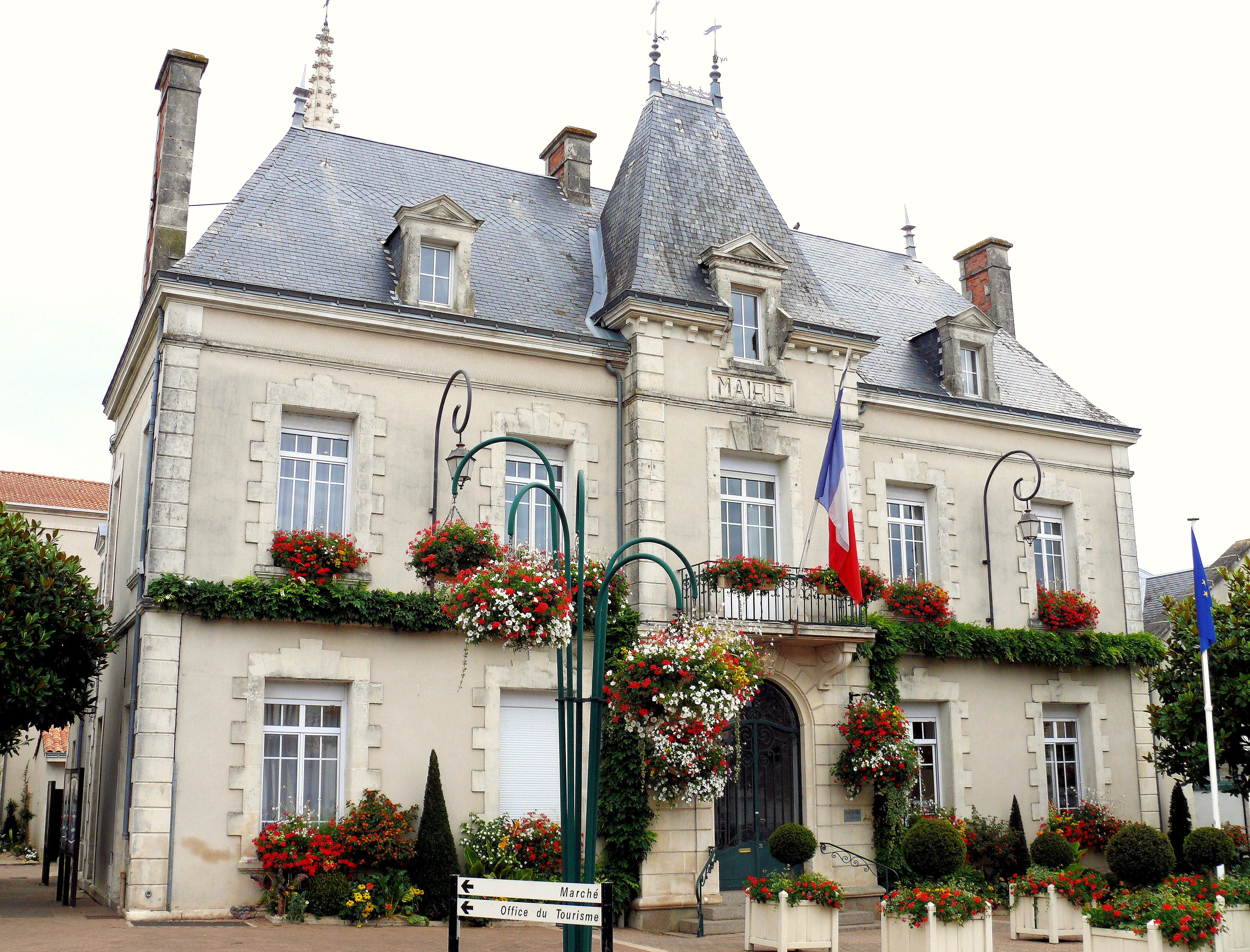
- The town hall in Chantonnay

- Coat of arms
- Location of Chantonnay
- Location within France Location within Pays de la Loire
- Coordinates: 46°41′16″N 1°02′58″W
- Country: France
- Region: Pays de la Loire
- Department: Vendée
- Arrondissement: La Roche-sur-Yon
- Canton: Chantonnay
- Intercommunality: Pays de Chantonnay

Government
  - Mayor (2020–2026): Isabelle Moinet
- Area^{1}: 82.91 km^{2} (32.01 sq mi)
- Highest elevation: 112 m (367 ft)
- Lowest elevation: 18 m (59 ft)
- Population (2023): 8,557
  - Density: 103.2/km^{2} (267.3/sq mi)
- Time zone: UTC+01:00 (CET)
  - Summer (DST): UTC+02:00 (CEST)
- INSEE/Postal code: 85051 /85110
- ^{1} French Land Register data, which excludes lakes, ponds, glaciers > 1 km^{2} (0.386 sq mi or 247 acres) and river estuaries.

Chantonnay (French: [ʃɑ̃tɔnɛ]) is a commune in the Vendée department in the Pays de la Loire region in western France.

== Geography ==
The river Lay flows southwestward through the commune and forms part of its eastern and southern borders.

=== Climate ===
Chantonnay has an oceanic climate (Köppen climate classification Cfb). The average annual temperature in Chantonnay is 12.3 °C (54.1 °F). The average annual rainfall is 876.9 mm (34.52 in) with November as the wettest month. The temperatures are highest on average in July, at around 19.9 °C (67.8 °F), and lowest in January, at around 5.4 °C (41.7 °F). The highest temperature ever recorded in Chantonnay was 44.6 °C (112.3 °F) on 24 June 2026; the coldest temperature ever recorded was −17.0 °C (1.4 °F) on 15 February 1956.

Climate data for Chantonnay (1981−2010 normals, extremes 1951−present)
Month	Jan	Feb	Mar	Apr	May	Jun	Jul	Aug	Sep	Oct	Nov	Dec	Year
Record high °C (°F)	16.7 (62.1)	24.0 (75.2)	26.8 (80.2)	30.3 (86.5)	35.0 (95.0)	44.6 (112.3)	39.8 (103.6)	41.0 (105.8)	35.2 (95.4)	31.6 (88.9)	22.8 (73.0)	19.0 (66.2)	44.6 (112.3)
Mean daily maximum °C (°F)	8.6 (47.5)	10.0 (50.0)	13.4 (56.1)	15.1 (59.2)	20.1 (68.2)	23.9 (75.0)	26.1 (79.0)	26.1 (79.0)	22.9 (73.2)	17.8 (64.0)	12.2 (54.0)	9.0 (48.2)	17.2 (63.0)
Daily mean °C (°F)	5.4 (41.7)	5.9 (42.6)	8.5 (47.3)	10.7 (51.3)	14.6 (58.3)	18.0 (64.4)	19.9 (67.8)	19.8 (67.6)	16.9 (62.4)	13.3 (55.9)	8.6 (47.5)	5.8 (42.4)	12.3 (54.1)
Mean daily minimum °C (°F)	2.2 (36.0)	1.8 (35.2)	3.7 (38.7)	5.4 (41.7)	9.1 (48.4)	12.0 (53.6)	13.7 (56.7)	13.5 (56.3)	10.8 (51.4)	8.8 (47.8)	4.9 (40.8)	2.6 (36.7)	7.4 (45.3)
Record low °C (°F)	−15.0 (5.0)	−17.0 (1.4)	−11.2 (11.8)	−5.0 (23.0)	−3.0 (26.6)	1.0 (33.8)	3.0 (37.4)	3.0 (37.4)	0.0 (32.0)	−4.4 (24.1)	−8.0 (17.6)	−12.5 (9.5)	−17.0 (1.4)
Average precipitation mm (inches)	97.5 (3.84)	67.4 (2.65)	63.5 (2.50)	67.3 (2.65)	62.6 (2.46)	44.0 (1.73)	49.9 (1.96)	45.2 (1.78)	73.2 (2.88)	106.9 (4.21)	96.3 (3.79)	103.1 (4.06)	876.9 (34.52)
Average precipitation days (≥ 1.0 mm)	13.2	10.4	11.0	10.9	10.4	7.1	7.2	6.7	8.4	12.3	13.1	13.3	123.9
Source: Météo-France

== Population ==
Historical population
Year	Pop.	±% p.a.
1968	6,172	—
1975	6,991	+1.80%
1982	7,235	+0.49%
1990	7,458	+0.38%
1999	7,541	+0.12%
2007	8,040	+0.80%
2012	8,306	+0.65%
2017	8,318	+0.03%
2023	8,557	+0.47%
Source: INSEE

== See also ==
- Communes of the Vendée department
