= Jean Antoine Rossignol =

French military officer (1759–1802)

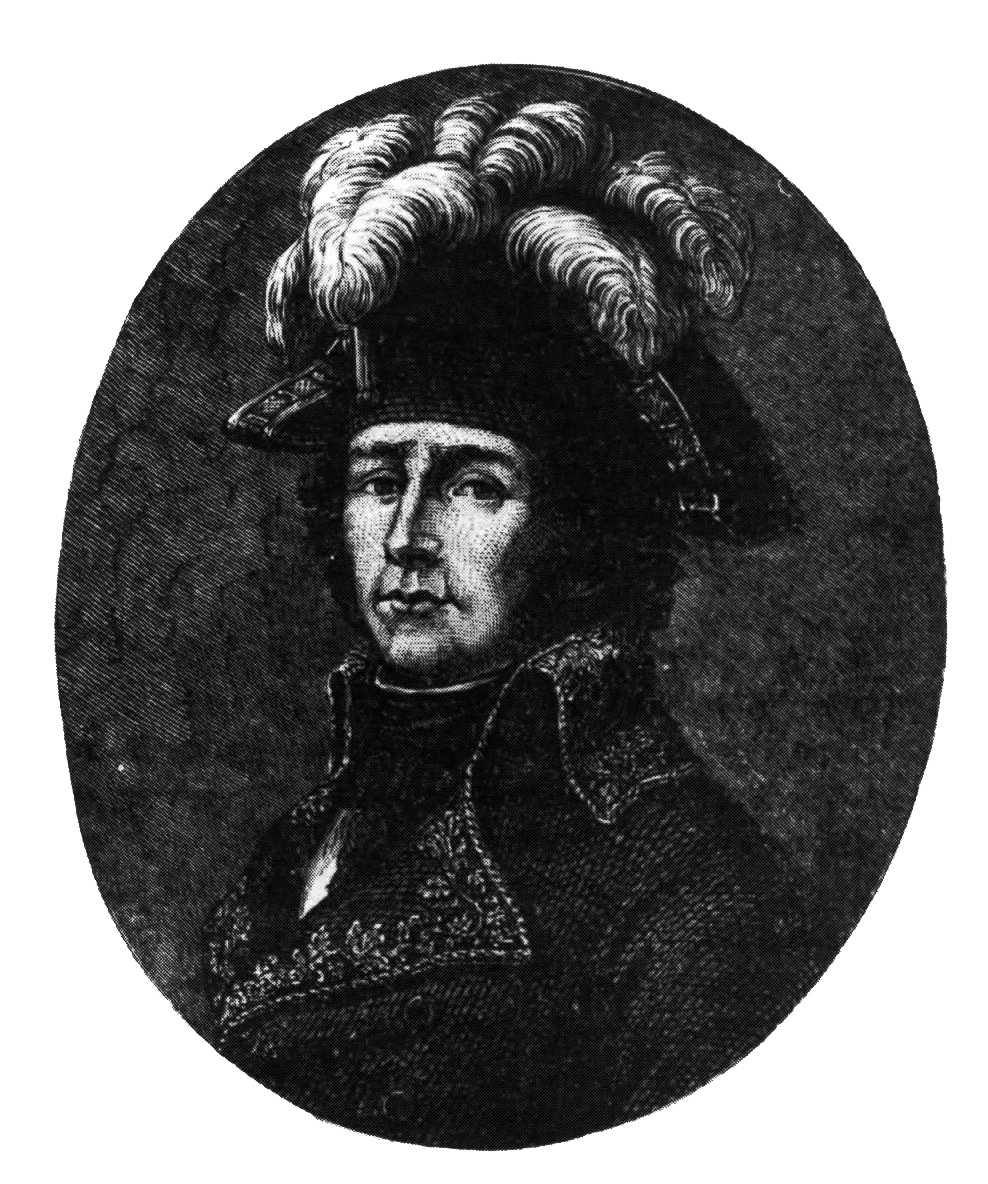
- Born: 7 November 1759; Paris
- Died: 27 April 1802 (aged 42); Anjouan
- Military career
- Allegiance: Kingdom of France; Kingdom of the French; First French Republic
- Branch: Army (Sans-culottes)
- Service years: 1775–1801
- Rank: Général de division
- Commands: Army of the West
- Conflicts: French Revolution; Storming of the Bastille; Capture of the Tuileries; French Revolutionary Wars; War in the Vendée; Virée de Galerne

Jean Antoine Rossignol (French pronunciation: [ʒɑ̃ ɑ̃twan ʁɔsiɲɔl]; 7 November 1759 – 27 April 1802) was a general of the French Revolutionary Wars.

== Life ==
=== Early life ===
Rossignol began his Memoirs, published in 1820 by Victor Barrucand, with the words: "I was born into a poor family. My father, who died before I was born, was a Bourguignon. He came to Paris and, after some years, he sought to marry. He thus got to know my mother and they married. Of the five children they had, I was the last." In 1774, aged 14, after 3 years' apprenticeship as a goldsmith, Rossignol, full of illusions and wanting to be his own master, left for the provinces. He journeyed by stages, stopping at Bordeaux, La Rochelle and Niort, before regretting his decision to leave Paris after six months and returning there. Faced with difficulties in finding work, he joined the Royal-Roussillon infantry regiment at Dunkirk on 13 August 1775, before the fall of the Ancien Régime.

On the outbreak of the French Revolution, Rossignol was in Paris - in the words of his Memoirs, "On 12 July 1789 I knew nothing of the Revolution, and did not suspect in any manner that it could hold me in any way." However, he participated in the storming of the Bastille on 14 July 1789 and in the revolutionary days of 20 June and 10 August (he was perhaps the man who shot Galiot Mandat de Grancey on 10 August).

=== Vendée ===
Lieutenant-colonel of the gendarmerie in 1793, général de brigade in the Vendée, under the protection of general Charles-Philippe Ronsin, he was made commander-in-chief of the Army of the West on 27 July 1793. He engaged in widespread looting and reported several successes. As a general Rossignol was accused of incompetence by his subordinate, Augustin Tuncq. He was removed from that role on 23 August 1793 by representatives on mission Léonard Bourdon and Philippe Charles Aimé Goupilleau de Montaigu, but even so was defended by Georges Danton and returned to it on 28 August 1793 by the National Convention, supported by Robespierre and Hébert at the Club des Jacobins in September 1793. He then became commander in chief of the Army of the Coasts of Brest, Army of the West and Army of the Coasts of Cherbourg on 12 November 1793 (22 brumaire year II). He was reestablished in this role several times despite several setbacks and a notorious inability.

He proposed a plan to the advocates of the council of war at Saumur was called absurd by Philippeaux and also by the soldiers of the Army of Mainz, interested in the outcome. Rossignol insisted and showed that the project that he supported was the only one that could be executed. The votes divided up equally, and he said "I see what I am in - the plan is indisputable, and it was me who was bothering everyone; ah well, I retire : our great decision must not be abased by personal rivalries; I accept serving under the orders of Canclaux, to put an end to all quarrels, if Canclaux wishes to command the march that he imposes." This gesture decided no one and Rossignol, in abstaining from taking part in the second vote, allowed his opponents to triumph in principle—but only in principle, for the turning march that they decided on resulted in the delays that he knew it would and the glorious defeat of the Mayenians themselves. It can be believed that the plan by Rossignol, an ignorant general, was not the best one, but we have an authoritative opinion of some value on the point—that of Napoleon himself. Judging the operations of the War in the Vendée at a distance, he declared that the only party to take to the Council of Saumur was to march directly and en masse, re-stating in several lines the plan proposed by Rossignol. The conduct of general Rossignol in the Vendée war, like that of all the Hébertist generals, was poorly appreciated by historians writing at a distance from the passions of that conflict. The opinion of general Turreau in his Mémoires pour servir à l’histoire de la Vendée, was the closest to the truth and to the ulterior motives presiding over Rossignol's fate.

=== Later life ===
Finally removed from office by the Committee of Public Safety, in April 1794, following disagreements with Billaud-Varenne during this Montagnard député's mission to Saint-Malo, he retired to Orléans, re-entering civil life. Imprisoned for several days after the Thermidorian Reaction, he was compromised in the Conjuration des Égaux of Babeuf, but managed to get himself exonerated before the High Court of Vendôme. He served the French Directory without conviction, all the while continuing (it seemed to him) a clandestine popular militarism in the suburb in which he had been born. After the plot of the rue Saint-Nicaise, Bonaparte used this chance to rid himself of Rossignol, imprisoning him. Transferred from prison to prison, he was condemned to deportation to the Seychelles in 1801, with other Jacobins, then transferred to the Comoros. Rossignol died at Anjouan in 1802, but the people refused to believe that their hero had died - it seemed at the time that he had committed suicide of the Fauborg. Rossignol thus survived in souvenirs, and took a position in the legend after the bad 4-volume novel Le Robinson du Faubourg Saint-Antoine.

== Bibliography ==
- Victor Barrucand, La vie véritable du citoyen Jean Rossignol, vainqueur de la Bastille et Général en Chef des armées de la République dans la guerre de Vendée (1759–1802), Paris, Librairie Plon, 1820.
- Adrien Bélanger, Rossignol, un plébéien dans la tourmente révolutionnaire (auto-édition), January 2005 (ISBN 2-9523027-0-7).
