= Battle of Pont-Barré =

Coordinates: 47°18′11″N 0°37′52″W

- Part of the War in the Vendée
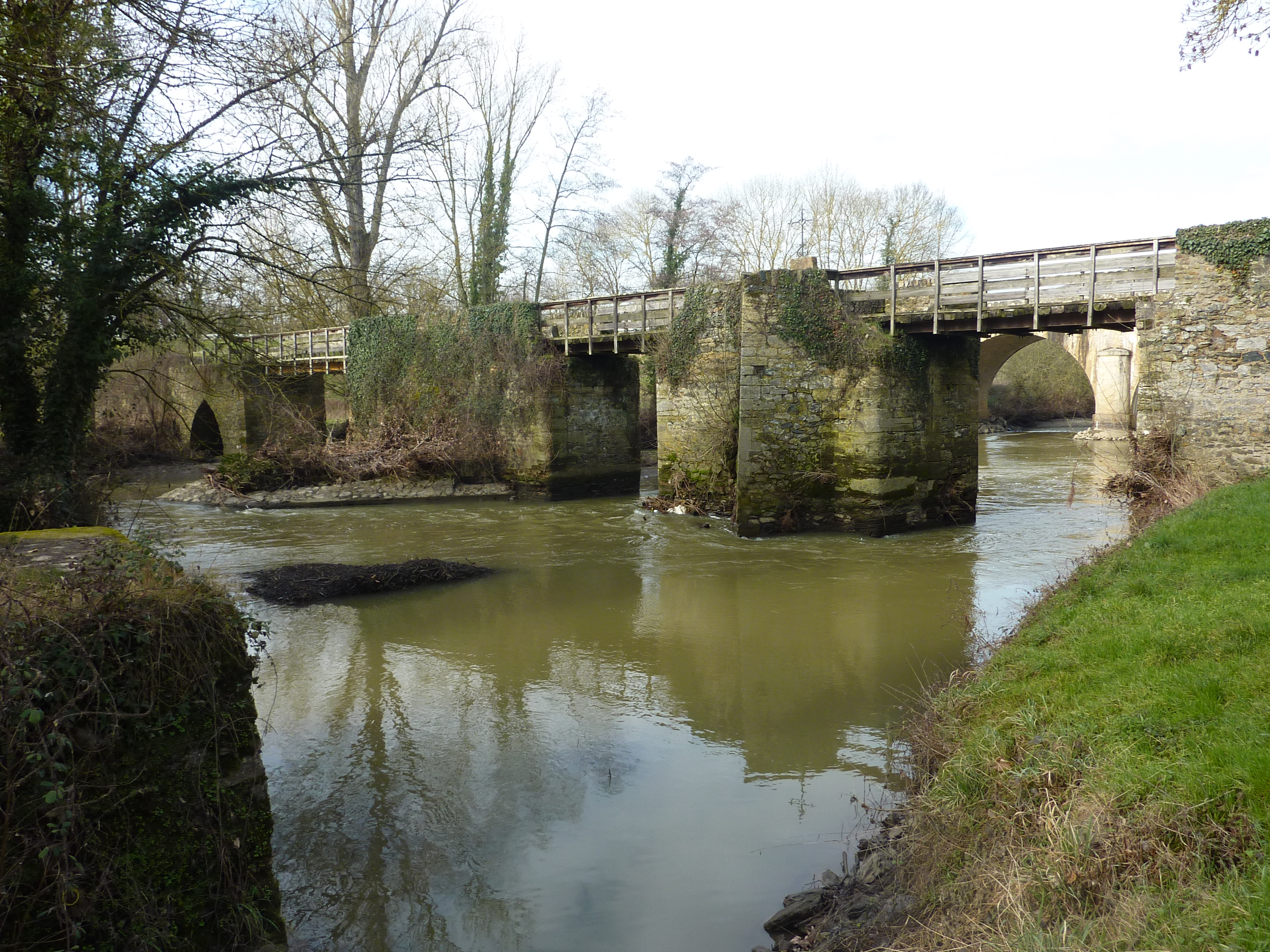
- The old Pont Barré over the Layon River
Date	20 September 1793
Location	Saint-Lambert-du-Lattay, France
Result	Vendean victory

Belligerents
(Kingdom of France) French Royalists	Republican France

Commanders and leaders
(Kingdom of France) Pierre Duhoux (Kingdom of France) Dominique Piron	(France) Jean Rossignol (France) Charles Duhoux

Units involved
(Kingdom of France) Catholic and Royal Army	(France) Army of the Coasts of La Rochelle

Strength
9,000	18,000

Casualties and losses
?	2,362

The Battle of Pont-Barré (20 September 1793) saw Royalist Vendeans under Pierre Duhoux and Dominique Piron de La Varenne fighting a Republican French column under Charles François Duhoux near Saint-Lambert-du-Lattay. Duhoux's Republican column advanced southwest from Angers and encountered Vendean defenders led by his nephew Pierre at the bridge (French: pont) over the Layon River. The rebels held their ground until reinforcements under Piron La Varenne arrived and gained the upper hand. The Vendeans put the Republicans to flight, killing 1,362 soldiers and capturing all their artillery. The action was part of a Republican strategy of invading the Vendée from several different directions. The rebels concentrated against and defeated the encroaching columns one by one at Coron, Tiffauges, Pont-Barré, Montaigu and Saint-Fulgent.

== Battle ==
On 20 September 1793 at Pont-Barré on the Layon, near Saint-Lambert-du-Lattay, the Republican forces of Charles François Duhoux d'Hauterive which sortied from Angers clashed with rebels led by the Republican general's own nephew, Pierre Duhoux d'Hauterive. The battle began and the Vendeans were markedly outnumbered but managed to resist the Blues. The majority of Republican troops were composed of conscripted farmers, less seasoned than the Vendean peasant soldiers. Dominique Piron de La Varenne, victorious the day before at the Battle of Coron arrived with reinforcements of cavalry and infantry. The Republicans had to beat a retreat and recoiled all the way to Les Ponts-de-Cé near Angers. The Republicans lost all their artillery and the nobleman Duhoux was later suspected of treason and of deliberately causing the defeat of his troops in favor of his nephew. The commissioner Pineau de Breuil later presided over the burial of those killed in the battle and counted 1,362 Republican bodies.
