= Guillaume Repin =

Blessed Guillaume Repin
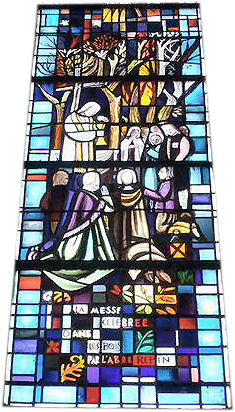

Martyr
- Born: 26 August 1709; Thouarcé, Maine-et-Loire, France
- Died: January 2, 1794 (aged 84); Angers, France
- Venerated in: Catholic Church
- Beatified: 19 February 1984 by Pope John Paul II
- Feast: 2 January

Guillaume Repin (26 August 1709 – 2 January 1794) was a French priest and martyr. He was beatified on 19 February 1984 by Pope John Paul II.

== Life ==
Repin was born in Thouarcé, Maine-et-Loire, France on 26 August 1709. He entered the seminary in Angers at nineteen years of age and was ordained a priest.

During the French Revolution, on June 17, 1792, he was arrested and kept at a prison workshop. He was released by The Vendee on 17 June 1793. He was arrested again on December 24, 1793, in Mauges and taken to prison to Chalonnes-sur-Loire. He was sentenced to the guillotine and executed by the order of the Revolutionary Committee of Angers.

== Beatification ==
Repin's spiritual writings were approved by theologians on 27 July 1951. He was beatified on February 19, 1984 by Pope John Paul II at Saint Peter's Square, Vatican. His feast is celebrated on 2 January.
