= Rablay-sur-Layon =

- Part of Bellevigne-en-Layon
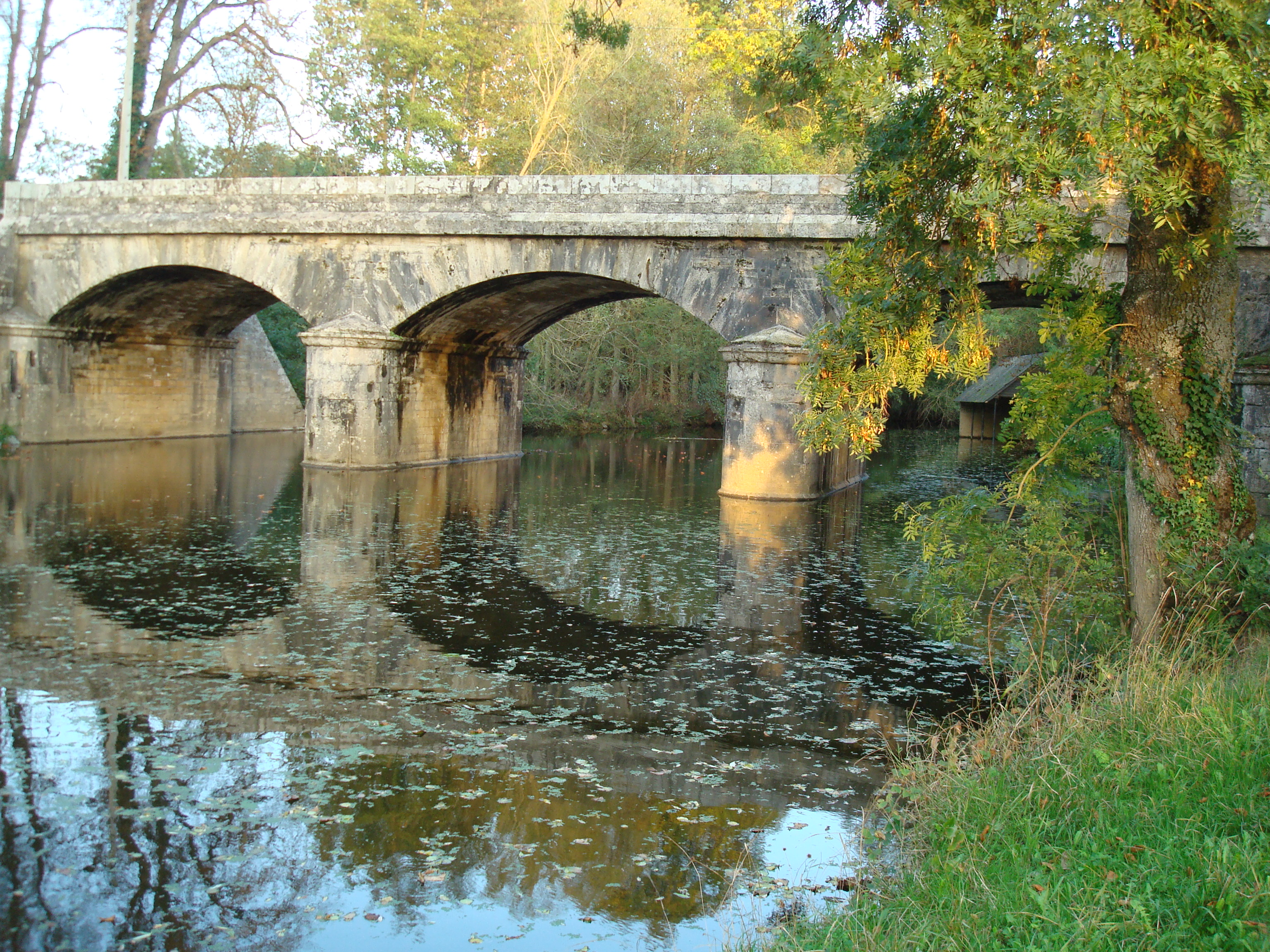
- The Layon at Rablay-sur-Layon
- Location of Rablay-sur-Layon
- Location within France Location within Pays de la Loire
- Coordinates: 47°17′45″N 0°34′31″W
- Country: France
- Region: Pays de la Loire
- Department: Maine-et-Loire
- Arrondissement: Angers
- Canton: Chemillé-Melay
- Commune: Bellevigne-en-Layon
- Area^{1}: 7.44 km^{2} (2.87 sq mi)
- Highest elevation: 89 m (292 ft)
- Lowest elevation: 20 m (66 ft)
- Population (2022): 742
  - Density: 99.7/km^{2} (258/sq mi)
- Demonym(s): Rablayen(s) (/ra.blε.jε̃/) et Rablayenne(s) (/ra.blε.jεn/)
- Time zone: UTC+01:00 (CET)
  - Summer (DST): UTC+02:00 (CEST)
- Postal code: 49750
- Website: www.rablaysurlayon.com
- ^{1} French Land Register data, which excludes lakes, ponds, glaciers > 1 km^{2} (0.386 sq mi or 247 acres) and river estuaries.

Rablay-sur-Layon (French pronunciation: [ʁablɛ syʁ lɛjɔ̃], literally Rablay on Layon) is a former commune in the Maine-et-Loire department in western France. On 1 January 2016, it was merged into the new commune of Bellevigne-en-Layon. Its population was 742 in 2022.

== Geography ==
The commune is traversed by the river Layon.

== See also ==
- Communes of the Maine-et-Loire department
