= Neuvy-en-Mauges =

- Part of Chemillé-en-Anjou
- Location of Neuvy-en-Mauges
- Location within France Location within Pays de la Loire
- Coordinates: 47°16′04″N 0°49′28″W
- Country: France
- Region: Pays de la Loire
- Department: Maine-et-Loire
- Arrondissement: Cholet
- Canton: Chemillé-Melay
- Commune: Chemillé-en-Anjou
- Area^{1}: 18.13 km^{2} (7.00 sq mi)
- Elevation: 98 m (322 ft)
- Highest elevation: 126 m (413 ft)
- Lowest elevation: 45 m (148 ft)
- Population (2022): 849
  - Density: 46.8/km^{2} (121/sq mi)
- Demonym(s): Neuvillois, Neuvilloise
- Time zone: UTC+01:00 (CET)
  - Summer (DST): UTC+02:00 (CEST)
- Postal code: 49120
- ^{1} French Land Register data, which excludes lakes, ponds, glaciers > 1 km^{2} (0.386 sq mi or 247 acres) and river estuaries.

Neuvy-en-Mauges (French pronunciation: [nøvi ɑ̃ moʒ]) is a former commune in the Maine-et-Loire department in western France.

On 15 December 2015, Chanzeaux, La Chapelle-Rousselin, Chemillé-Melay, Cossé-d'Anjou, La Jumellière, Neuvy-en-Mauges, Sainte-Christine, Saint-Georges-des-Gardes, Saint-Lézin, La Salle-de-Vihiers, La Tourlandry and Valanjou merged becoming one commune called Chemillé-en-Anjou.

== See also ==
- Communes of the Maine-et-Loire department
