= Chemillé =

Commune in Maine-et-Loire, France

- Part of Chemillé-en-Anjou
- Coat of arms
- Location of Chemillé
- Location within France Location within Pays de la Loire
- Coordinates: 47°18′36″N 0°28′06″W
- Country: France
- Region: Pays de la Loire
- Department: Maine-et-Loire
- Arrondissement: Cholet
- Canton: Chemillé-Melay
- Commune: Chemillé-en-Anjou
- Area^{1}: 49.2 km^{2} (19.0 sq mi)
- Highest elevation: 114 m (374 ft)
- Lowest elevation: 42 m (138 ft)
- Population (2022): 7,550
  - Density: 153/km^{2} (397/sq mi)
- Time zone: UTC+01:00 (CET)
  - Summer (DST): UTC+02:00 (CEST)
- Postal code: 49120
- ^{1} French Land Register data, which excludes lakes, ponds, glaciers > 1 km^{2} (0.386 sq mi or 247 acres) and river estuaries.

Chemillé (French pronunciation: [ʃəmije]) is a former commune in the Maine-et-Loire department in western France. In January 2013 it became part of the new commune Chemillé-Melay, which became part of Chemillé-en-Anjou in December 2015. Its population was 7,550 in 2022.

== See also ==
- Communes of the Maine-et-Loire department
