= Michel Piron =

French politician

Member of the National Assembly for Maine-et-Loire's 4th constituency
- In office 19 June 2002 – 20 June 2017
- Preceded by: Jean-Michel Marchand
- Succeeded by: Laetitia Saint-Paul

Mayor of Thouarcé
- In office 14 March 1983 – 12 June 2003
- Preceded by: Roger Gourdon
- Succeeded by: Jean-Yves Le Bars

Personal details
- Born: 15 March 1943 (age 83) Saumur, France
- Party: Union for French Democracy (1971–2002); Union for a Popular Movement (2002–2013); Union of Democrats and Independents (2013–2017)

Michel Piron (born 15 March 1943) is a French politician who represented the 4th constituency of the Maine-et-Loire department in the National Assembly from 2002 to 2017. A former member of the Union for a Popular Movement (UMP), he joined the Union of Democrats and Independents (UDI) in 2013.

== Political career ==
Piron was first elected to the municipal council of Thouarcé in 1971 for the Union for French Democracy (UDF). He went on to become Deputy Mayor of Thouarcé in 1977 before he was elected to the mayorship in 1983, which he held until his resignation mid-2003. In 2001, he was also elected to the General Council of Maine-et-Loire for the canton of Thouarcé, a seat which he held until 2015.

In the 2002 legislative election, Piron was elected to the National Assembly in the 4th constituency of Maine-et-Loire. Later in 2002 he joined the newly-established Union for a Popular Movement (UMP). In the 2012 UMP leadership election, he supported François Fillon.

At the beginning of the 14th National Assembly (2012–2017) under the Fifth Republic, Piron joined the dissident Rassemblement-UMP group in late 2012. In 2013, he joined the UDI group in Parliament as a member of the Union of Democrats and Independents (UDI).

Prior to the 2017 presidential election, Piron supported the UDI's decision to back Alain Juppé in the 2016 The Republicans presidential primary since the UDI decided it would not nominate a candidate of its own. Following Juppé's primary loss to Fillon and amid the Fillon affair, Piron stated he would no longer support the primary nominee ahead of the election.

After he declined to seek reelection to a fourth parliamentary term at the 2017 legislative election, he retired from national politics. In 2022, he stated he voted for Emmanuel Macron's presidential reelection bid.
