= Chemillé-Melay =

- Former commune
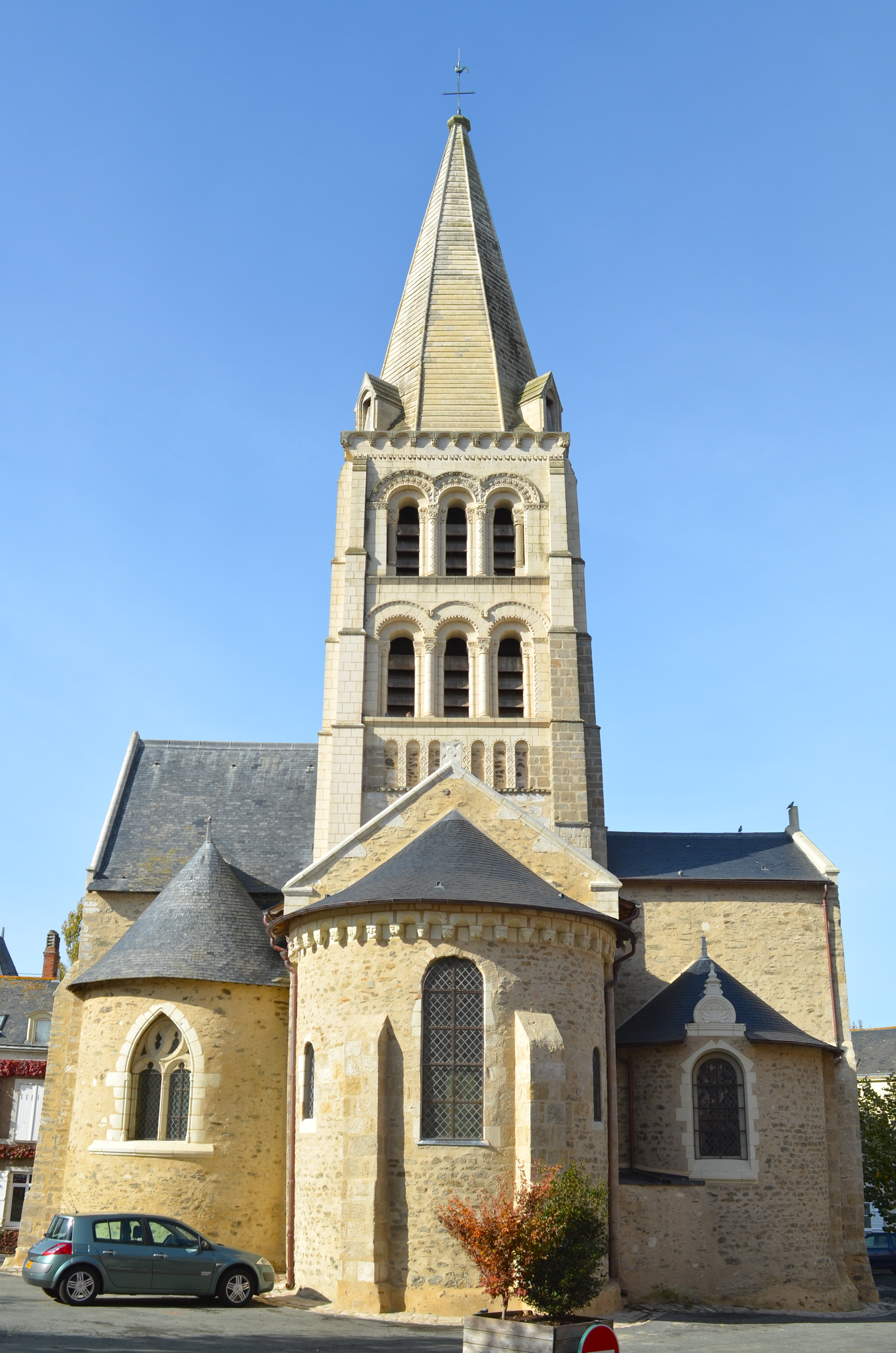
- Location of Chemillé-Melay
- Location within France Location within Pays de la Loire
- Coordinates: 47°12′53″N 0°43′58″W
- Country: France
- Region: Pays de la Loire
- Department: Maine-et-Loire
- Arrondissement: Cholet
- Canton: Chemillé-en-Anjou
- Area^{1}: 71.90 km^{2} (27.76 sq mi)
- Population (2013): 8,822
  - Density: 122.7/km^{2} (317.8/sq mi)
- Time zone: UTC+01:00 (CET)
  - Summer (DST): UTC+02:00 (CEST)
- INSEE/Postal code: 49092 /49120
- ^{1} French Land Register data, which excludes lakes, ponds, glaciers > 1 km^{2} (0.386 sq mi or 247 acres) and river estuaries.

Chemillé-Melay (French pronunciation: [ʃəmije məlɛ]) was a short-lived commune in the department of Maine-et-Loire in western France.

The commune was established on 1 January 2013 by merger of the former communes of Chemillé and Melay. On 15 December 2015, Chanzeaux, La Chapelle-Rousselin, Chemillé-Melay, Cossé-d'Anjou, La Jumellière, Neuvy-en-Mauges, Sainte-Christine, Saint-Georges-des-Gardes, Saint-Lézin, La Salle-de-Vihiers, La Tourlandry, and Valanjou merged becoming one commune called Chemillé-en-Anjou.

== See also ==
- Communes of the Maine-et-Loire department
