= Champ-sur-Layon =

- Part of Bellevigne-en-Layon
- Location of Champ-sur-Layon
- Location within France Location within Pays de la Loire
- Coordinates: 47°16′02″N 0°34′29″W
- Country: France
- Region: Pays de la Loire
- Department: Maine-et-Loire
- Arrondissement: Angers
- Canton: Chemillé-Melay
- Commune: Bellevigne-en-Layon
- Area^{1}: 19.19 km^{2} (7.41 sq mi)
- Highest elevation: 92 m (302 ft)
- Lowest elevation: 22 m (72 ft)
- Population (2022): 936
  - Density: 48.8/km^{2} (126/sq mi)
- Demonym(s): Champenais, Champenaise
- Time zone: UTC+01:00 (CET)
  - Summer (DST): UTC+02:00 (CEST)
- Postal code: 49380
- Website: www.champsurlayon.fr
- ^{1} French Land Register data, which excludes lakes, ponds, glaciers > 1 km^{2} (0.386 sq mi or 247 acres) and river estuaries.

Champ-sur-Layon (French pronunciation: [ʃɑ̃ syʁ lɛjɔ̃], literally Champ on Layon) is a former commune in the Maine-et-Loire department in western France. On 1 January 2016, it was merged into the new commune of Bellevigne-en-Layon.

== Geography ==
The commune is traversed by the river Layon.

== See also ==
- Joseph Gelineau
- Communes of the Maine-et-Loire department
