= Saint-Georges-des-Gardes =

- Part of Chemillé-en-Anjou
- Location of Saint-Georges-des-Gardes
- Location within France Location within Pays de la Loire
- Coordinates: 47°09′03″N 0°45′29″W
- Country: France
- Region: Pays de la Loire
- Department: Maine-et-Loire
- Arrondissement: Cholet
- Canton: Chemillé-Melay
- Commune: Chemillé-en-Anjou
- Area^{1}: 27.53 km^{2} (10.63 sq mi)
- Elevation: 171 m (561 ft)
- Highest elevation: 211 m (692 ft)
- Lowest elevation: 77 m (253 ft)
- Population (2022): 1,630
  - Density: 59.2/km^{2} (153/sq mi)
- Time zone: UTC+01:00 (CET)
  - Summer (DST): UTC+02:00 (CEST)
- Postal code: 49120
- ^{1} French Land Register data, which excludes lakes, ponds, glaciers > 1 km^{2} (0.386 sq mi or 247 acres) and river estuaries.

Saint-Georges-des-Gardes (French pronunciation: [sɛ̃ ʒɔʁʒ de ɡaʁd]) is a former commune in the Maine-et-Loire department in western France. It was created in 1973 by the merger of two former communes: Saint-Georges-du-Puy-de-la-Garde and Les Gardes. Its population was 1,630 in 2022.

On 15 December 2015, Chanzeaux, La Chapelle-Rousselin, Chemillé-Melay, Cossé-d'Anjou, La Jumellière, Neuvy-en-Mauges, Sainte-Christine, Saint-Georges-des-Gardes, Saint-Lézin, La Salle-de-Vihiers, La Tourlandry and Valanjou merged becoming one commune called Chemillé-en-Anjou.

== See also ==
- Communes of the Maine-et-Loire department
