= Faye-d'Anjou =

- Part of Bellevigne-en-Layon
- Location of Faye-d'Anjou
- Location within France Location within Pays de la Loire
- Coordinates: 47°17′36″N 0°31′08″W
- Country: France
- Region: Pays de la Loire
- Department: Maine-et-Loire
- Arrondissement: Angers
- Canton: Chemillé-Melay
- Commune: Bellevigne-en-Layon
- Area^{1}: 30.4 km^{2} (11.7 sq mi)
- Elevation: 90 m (300 ft)
- Highest elevation: 104 m (341 ft)
- Lowest elevation: 22 m (72 ft)
- Population (2022): 1,519
  - Density: 50.0/km^{2} (129/sq mi)
- Demonym(s): Fayen, Fayenne
- Time zone: UTC+01:00 (CET)
  - Summer (DST): UTC+02:00 (CEST)
- Postal code: 49380
- ^{1} French Land Register data, which excludes lakes, ponds, glaciers > 1 km^{2} (0.386 sq mi or 247 acres) and river estuaries.

Faye-d'Anjou (French pronunciation: [fɛ dɑ̃ʒu], literally Faye of Anjou) is a former commune in the Maine-et-Loire department in western France. On 1 January 2016, it was merged into the new commune of Bellevigne-en-Layon.

== Geography ==
The river Layon forms all of the commune's south-western border.

== See also ==
- Communes of the Maine-et-Loire department
