= Melay =

Melay is the name or part of the name of the following communes in France:

- Melay, Maine-et-Loire, in the Maine-et-Loire department
- Melay, Haute-Marne, in the Haute-Marne department
- Melay, Saône-et-Loire, in the Saône-et-Loire department
- Ternuay-Melay-et-Saint-Hilaire, in the Haute-Saône department
