= Christiane Eda-Pierre =

French singer (1932–2020)

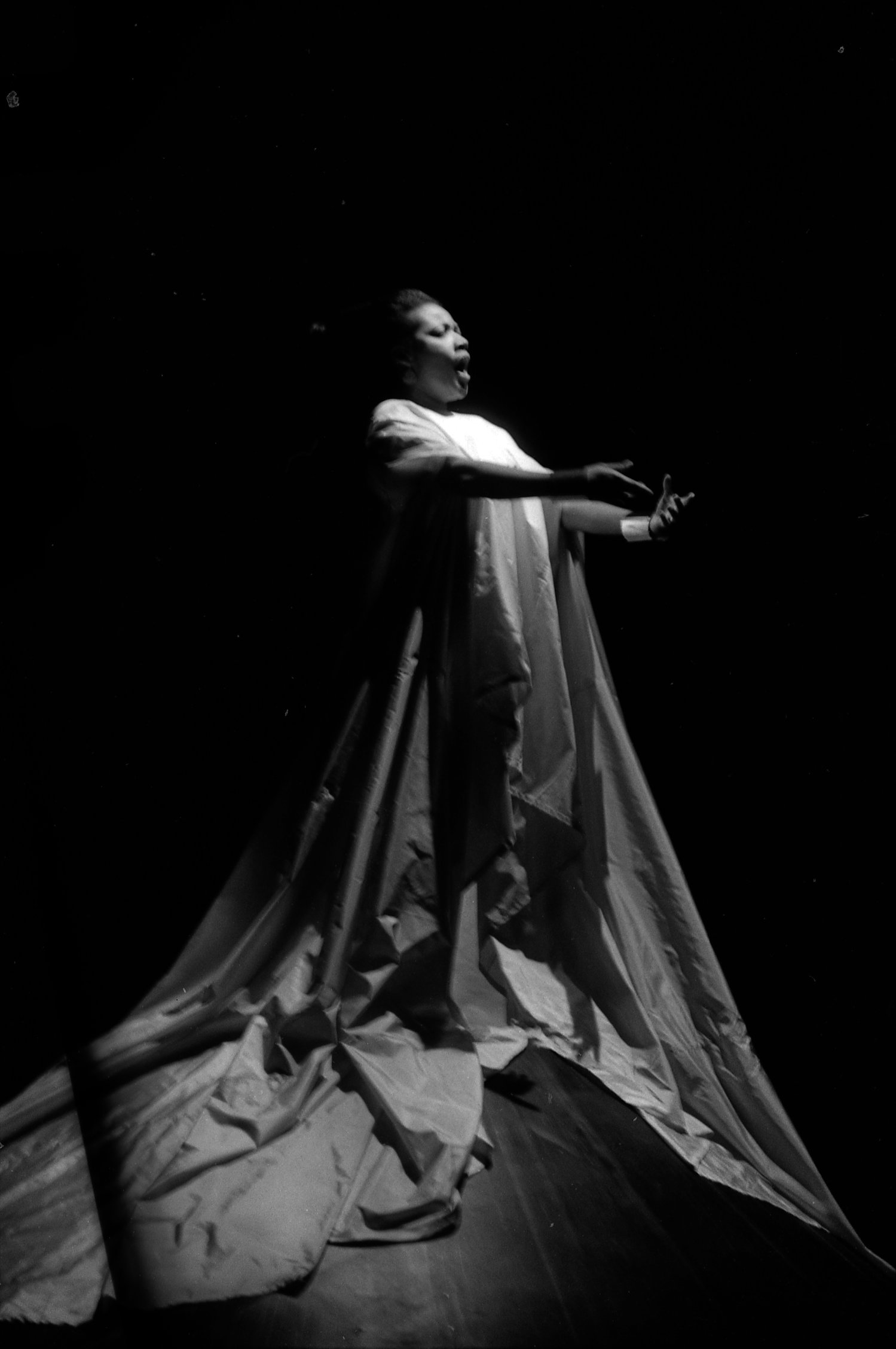
- Eda-Pierre at the Théâtre du Capitole on 11 January 1968
- Born: 24 March 1932; Fort-de-France, Martinique
- Died: 6 September 2020 (aged 88); Saint-Maurice-la-Fougereuse, Deux-Sèvres, France
- Occupations: Opera singer; teacher
- Awards: Ordre national du Mérite; Legion of Honour

Christiane Eda-Pierre (24 March 1932 – 6 September 2020) was a French coloratura soprano of Martinican origin, who sang in a wide variety of roles, from baroque to contemporary works.

== Life and career ==
Eda-Pierre was born in Fort-de-France, Martinique, in a family of intellectuals. She is the daughter of journalist William Eda-Pierre and music teacher Alice Nardal, and the niece of Paulette Nardal. From a young age, she learnt piano from her mother. In September 1950, she left for Paris, studying at the École Normale de Musique de Paris for two years. After the lessons from Charles Panzéra, she switched from piano to singing. In 1954, she attended the Conservatoire de Paris, where she learnt singing from Louis Noguéra and diction from Gabrielle Fontan. She graduated with honours in 1957. The same year, she made her professional debut in Nice, as Leïla in Les pêcheurs de perles.

She made her debut at the Opéra-Comique in 1958, as Lakmé, at the Aix-en-Provence Festival in 1959, as Papagena in The Magic Flute, and at the Palais Garnier in 1960, as Lucia di Lammermoor. She sang there the standard lyric coloratura roles of the French and Italian repertoire. She also won great acclaim in Mozart roles, especially as Konstanze in Die Entführung aus dem Serail, as well as the Countess in Le nozze di Figaro, Donna Anna and Elvira in Don Giovanni, The Queen of the Night in Die Zauberflöte

Eda-Pierre was much appreciated in French baroque opera, particularly in the works of Jean-Philippe Rameau, including Les Indes Galantes, Zoroastre, Les Boréades (taking part in the first modern performance in September 1964), and Dardanus. She was also very active on French Radio where she sang in little performed works, such as Rossini's Le siège de Corinthe, Bellini's Il pirata, Bizet's La jolie fille de Perth, as well as Berlioz's Béatrice et Bénédict and Benvenuto Cellini.

She created many contemporary works, such as Capdieville's Les amants captifs (1960), Chaynes's Pour un monde noir (1979), and Erszebet (1983). In 1983 she also created the role of the Angel in Olivier Messiaen's Saint François d'Assise, at the Opéra de Paris.

Eda-Pierre also appeared to great acclaim internationally, including Lisbon, London, Wexford, Berlin, Hamburg, Vienna, Salzburg, Moscow, Chicago, and New York. She made her Metropolitan Opera debut in 1980 as Konstanze, and went on to sing other roles the next two years: Gilda in Rigoletto (with Luciano Pavarotti) and Antonia in Les contes d'Hoffmann (with Plácido Domingo).

She became a teacher at the Conservatoire de Paris in 1977, while continuing her career in opera and in concert.

The possessor of a beautiful, rich and agile voice, which enabled her to succeed in a wide variety of roles, Eda-Pierre can be heard on several recordings, her three most famous being on the Philips label, as Konstanze in Die Entführung aus dem Serail and Teresa in Benvenuto Cellini, both under Sir Colin Davis, and an album of arias from the French opéra-comiques of Grétry and Philidor, under Sir Neville Marriner. For the Bizet centenary in 1975 she participated in BBC studio recordings of La Jolie Fille de Perth and Le Docteur Miracle.

== Honours ==
Eda-Pierre was invested Commandeur of the Ordre national du Mérite in 1997, and promoted to Grand Officier in 2011. She was made an Chevalier of the Legion of Honour in 2007, and was promoted to the rank of Officier in 2016.

== Publication ==
- Marceline, Catherine (2019). Christiane Eda-Pierre: Une vie d'excellence. Fort de France. ISBN 9791069930209.

== Sources ==
- D. Hamilton (ed.),The Metropolitan Opera Encyclopedia: A Complete Guide to the World of Opera (Simon and Schuster, New York 1987). ISBN 0-671-61732-X
- Roland Mancini and Jean-Jacques Rouveroux, (orig. H. Rosenthal and J. Warrack, French edition), Guide de l’opéra, Les indispensables de la musique (Fayard, 1995). ISBN 2-213-59567-4
