= Beaulieu-sur-Layon =

- Commune
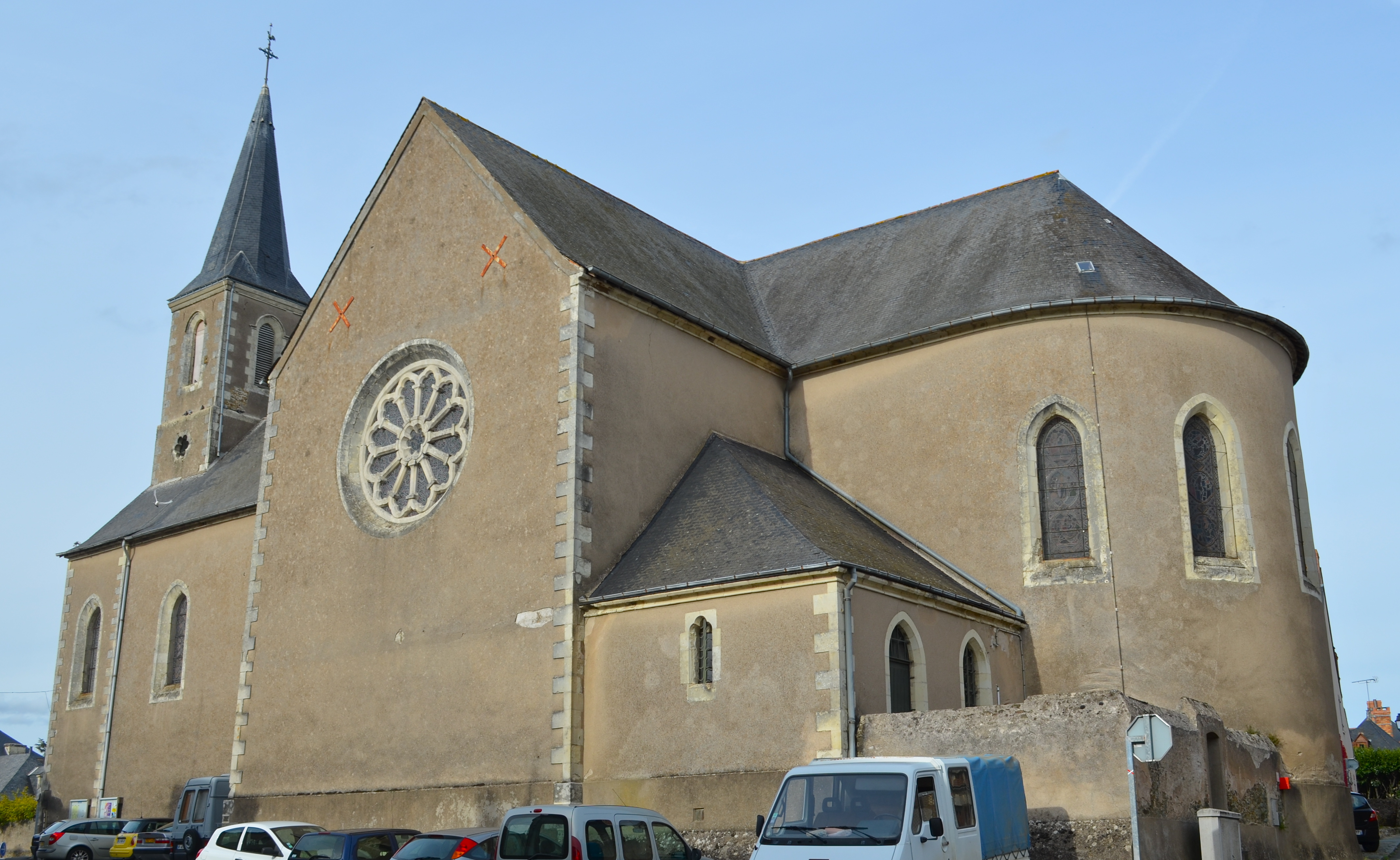
- The church in Beaulieu-sur-Layon
- Location of Beaulieu-sur-Layon
- Location within France Location within Pays de la Loire
- Coordinates: 47°18′41″N 0°35′17″W
- Country: France
- Region: Pays de la Loire
- Department: Maine-et-Loire
- Arrondissement: Angers
- Canton: Chemillé-en-Anjou

Government
  - Mayor (2022–2026): Martine Chauvin
- Area^{1}: 12.78 km^{2} (4.93 sq mi)
- Elevation: 97 m (318 ft)
- Highest elevation: 104 m (341 ft)
- Lowest elevation: 17 m (56 ft)
- Population (2023): 1,345
  - Density: 105.2/km^{2} (272.6/sq mi)
- Time zone: UTC+01:00 (CET)
  - Summer (DST): UTC+02:00 (CEST)
- INSEE/Postal code: 49022 /49750
- ^{1} French Land Register data, which excludes lakes, ponds, glaciers > 1 km^{2} (0.386 sq mi or 247 acres) and river estuaries.

Beaulieu-sur-Layon (French pronunciation: [boljø syʁ lɛjɔ̃], literally Beaulieu on Layon) is a commune in the Maine-et-Loire department in western France. The composer and organist Louis Aubeux (1917–1999) was born in Beaulieu-sur-Layon.

== Geography ==
The commune is traversed by the river Layon.

== Population ==
Historical population
Year	Pop.	±% p.a.
1968	948	—
1975	944	−0.06%
1982	995	+0.75%
1990	981	−0.18%
1999	1,069	+0.96%
2007	1,393	+3.36%
2012	1,421	+0.40%
2017	1,391	−0.43%
2023	1,345	−0.56%
Source: INSEE

== See also ==
- Communes of the Maine-et-Loire department
