= Layon =

River in France

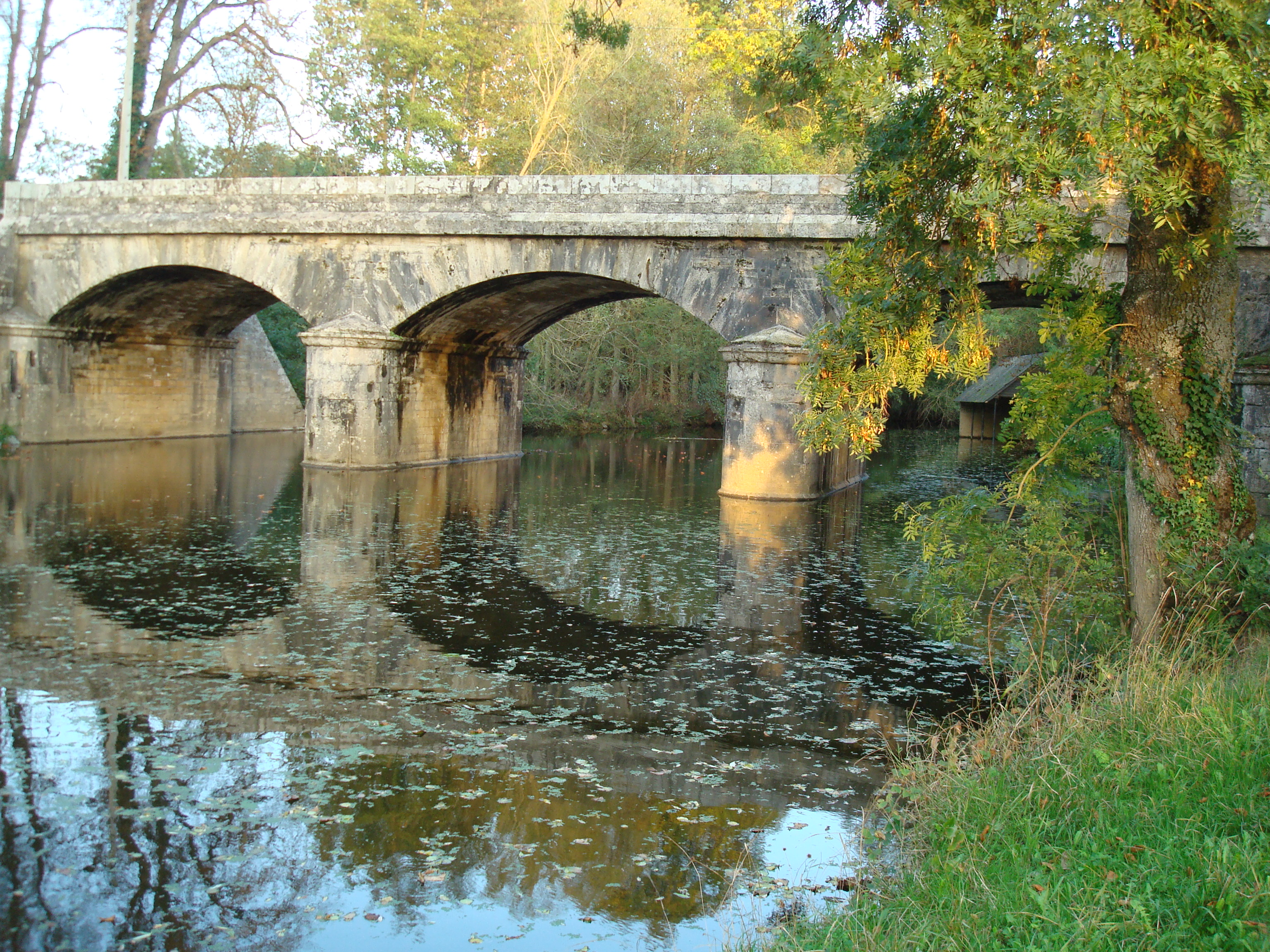
- The Layon at Rablay-sur-Layon

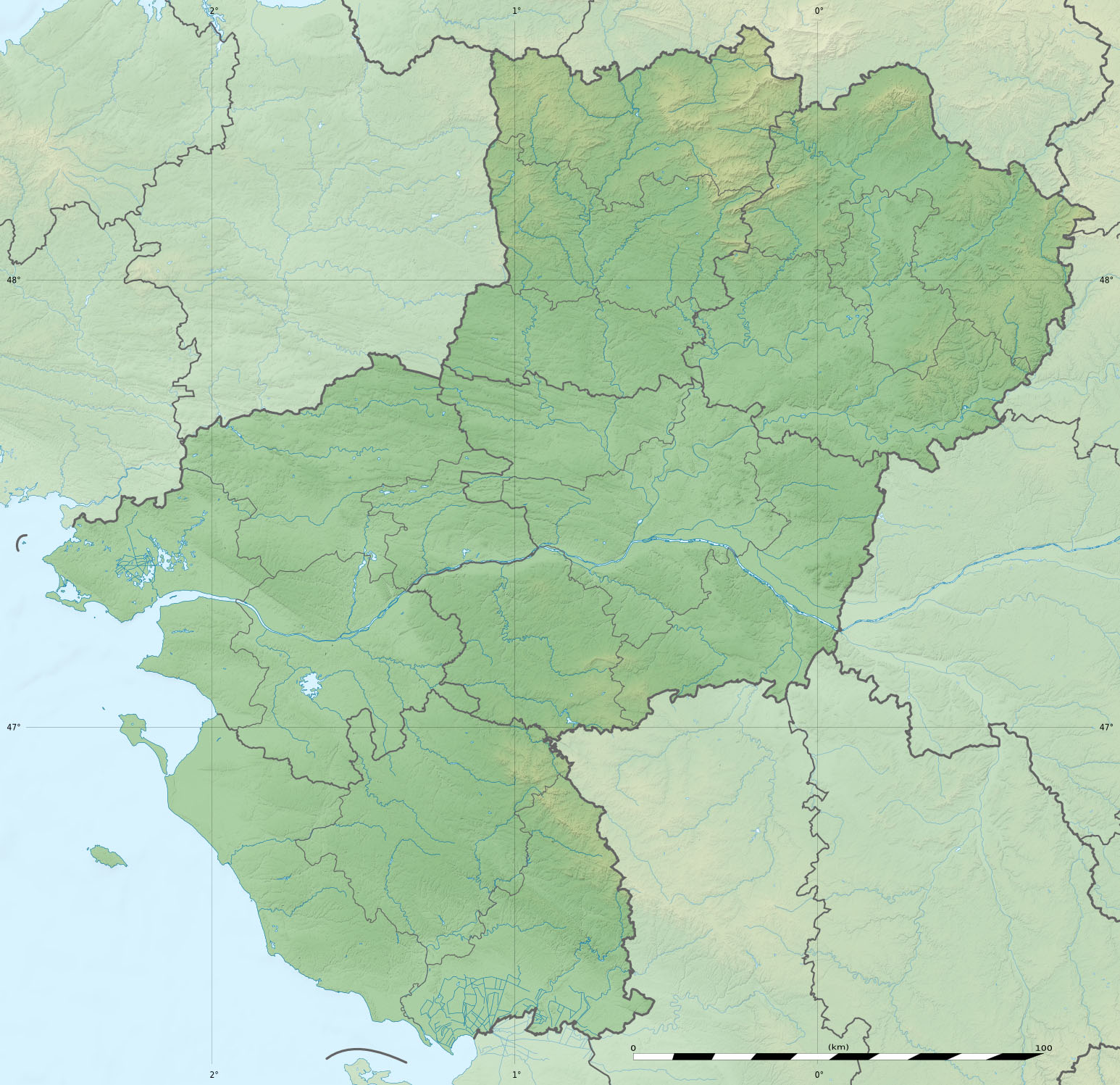
- Location within France Location within Pays de la Loire

Location
- Country: France

Physical characteristics
- Source
  - location: Saint-Maurice-la-Fougereuse
  - coordinates: 47°03′47″N 00°29′06″W
  - elevation: 105 m (344 ft)
- Mouth
  - location: Loire
  - coordinates: 47°21′02″N 00°45′16″W
  - elevation: 12 m (39 ft)
- Length: 89.9 km (55.9 mi)
- Basin size: 950 km^{2} (370 sq mi)
- Discharge
  - average: 4.05 m^{3}/s (143 cu ft/s)

Basin features
- Progression: Loire→ Atlantic Ocean

The Layon (French pronunciation: [lɛjɔ̃]) is an 89.9 km (55.9 mi) long river in the Deux-Sèvres and Maine-et-Loire departments in western France. Its source is near Saint-Maurice-la-Fougereuse. It flows generally northwest. It is a left tributary of the Loire, into which it flows near Chalonnes-sur-Loire.

== Departments and communes along its course ==
This list is ordered from source to mouth:

- Deux-Sèvres: Saint-Maurice-la-Fougereuse, Genneton
- Maine-et-Loire: Cléré-sur-Layon, Passavant-sur-Layon, Nueil-sur-Layon, Les Verchers-sur-Layon, Concourson-sur-Layon, Saint-Georges-sur-Layon, Brigné, Martigné-Briand, Tigné, Aubigné-sur-Layon, Faveraye-Mâchelles, Thouarcé, Faye-d'Anjou, Champ-sur-Layon, Rablay-sur-Layon, Chanzeaux, Beaulieu-sur-Layon, Saint-Lambert-du-Lattay, Rochefort-sur-Loire, Saint-Aubin-de-Luigné, Chaudefonds-sur-Layon, Chalonnes-sur-Loire
