= Maine-et-Loire's 4th constituency =

Constituency of the National Assembly of France

4th constituency of Maine-et-Loire
- inline Constituency of the National Assembly of France

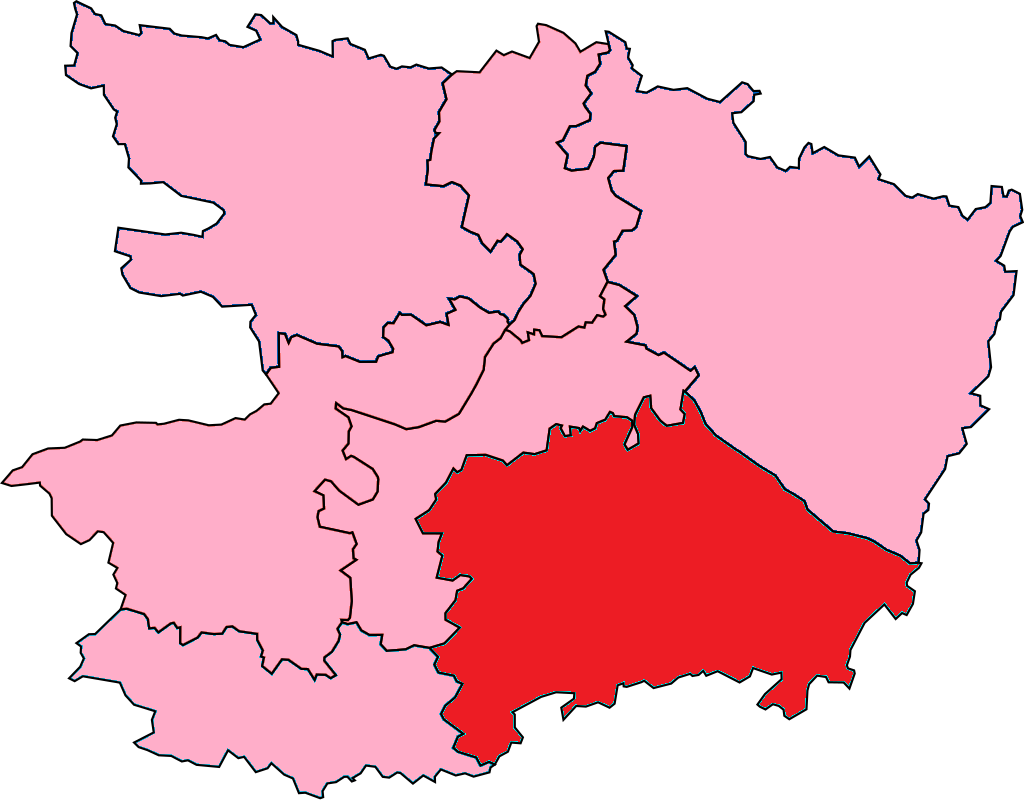
- Maine-et-Loire's 4th Constituency shown within Maine-et-Loire
- Deputy: Laëtitia Saint-Paul; RE
- Department: Maine-et-Loire
- Cantons: Doué-la-Fontaine, Gennes, Montreuil-Bellay, Saumur Sud, Thouarcé, Vihiers
- Registered voters: 74274

The 4th constituency of Maine-et-Loire (French: Quatrième circonscription de Maine-et-Loire) is a French legislative constituency in the Maine-et-Loire département. Like the other 576 French constituencies, it elects one MP using a two round electoral system.

== Description ==
The 4th Constituency of Maine-et-Loire is situated in the south east of the department. It includes the south of Saumur a town famed for its wine production, the northern half of the town is contained within Maine-et-Loire's 3rd constituency.

Politically the seat has historically favoured centre right candidates. It did, however, elect a Green Party deputy in 1997 and along with the majority of seats in Maine-et-Loire opt for En Marche! in 2017.

== Assembly members ==
Election	Member	Party
1988	Jean Bégault	UDF
1993	Jean Bégault	UDF
1997	Jean-Michel Marchand	LV
2002	Michel Piron	UMP
2007	Michel Piron	UMP
2012	Michel Piron	UMP
2013	Michel Piron	UDI
2017	Laëtitia Saint-Paul	LREM
2022	Laëtitia Saint-Paul	RE

== Election results ==
=== 2024 ===
Candidate	Party	Alliance	First round		Second round	
Candidate	Party	Alliance	Votes	%	Votes	%
Laetitia Saint-Paul	REN	ENS	18,001	34.87	30,476	60.03
Aurore Lahondès	RN		18,014	34.90	20,289	39.97
Charlyne Bouvet	PCF	NFP	10,629	20.59		
Frédéric Mortier	LR		3,455	6.69		
Nicolas Vitasse	DLF	DSV	769	1.49		
Sylvie Geret	LO		750	1.45		
Nicolas Vitasse	DIV	Far left	3	0.01		
Valid votes			51,621	96.86	50,765	95.15
Blank votes			1,085	2.04	1,949	3.65
Null votes			586	1.10	637	1.19
Turnout			53,292	70.00	53,351	70.07
Abstentions			22,834	30.00	2,279	29.93
Registered voters			76,126		76,142	
Result			REN HOLD			

=== 2022 ===
Legislative Election 2022: Maine-et-Loire's 4th constituency
Party	Candidate	Votes	%	±%
LREM (Ensemble)	Laëtitia Saint-Paul	14,298	38.63	+0.47
PCF (NUPÉS)	Caroline Rabault	8,544	23.09	+5.53
RN	Patrick Morineau	7,308	19.75	+7.26
LR (UDC)	Régine Catin	2,598	7.02	−11.24
REC	Charles-Henri Jamin	1,887	5.10	N/A
LMR	Gérard Herve	830	2.24	N/A
Others	N/A	1,546	4.18	
Turnout		37,011	49.83	−1.32
2nd round result
LREM (Ensemble)	Laëtitia Saint-Paul	19,913	60.33	+2.10
PCF (NUPÉS)	Caroline Rabault	13,093	39.67	N/A
Turnout		33,006	47.16	+8.19
LREM hold				

=== 2017 ===
Legislative Election 2017: Maine-et-Loire's 4th constituency
Party	Candidate	Votes	%	±%
LREM	Laëtitia Saint-Paul	14,496	38.16	
UDI	Eric Touron	6,937	18.26	
FN	Aymeric Merlaud	4,744	12.49	
LFI	France Moreau	3,451	9.08	
DVD	Charles-Henri Jamin	2,138	5.63	
PS	Meriem Baba	1,895	4.99	
EELV	Christelle Cardet	1,324	3.49	
DLF	Patrick Daviaud	836	2.20	
DIV	Caroline Coignard	824	2.17	
Others	N/A	1,343		
Turnout		37,988	51.15	
2nd round result
LREM	Laëtitia Saint-Paul	16,857	58.23	
UDI	Eric Touron	12,091	41.77	
Turnout		28,948	38.97	
LREM gain from LR				

=== 2012 ===
Legislative Election 2012: Maine-et-Loire's 4th constituency
Party	Candidate	Votes	%	±%
UMP	Michel Piron	19,452	44.62	
PS	Sophie Saramito	14,403	33.04	
FN	Monique Lieumont Briand	4,932	11.31	
FG	Gaëlle Chardon	1,754	4.02	
EELV	Catherine Brauer	1,344	3.08	
Others	N/A	1,709		
Turnout		43,594	59.26	
2nd round result
UMP	Michel Piron	22,894	55.17	
PS	Sophie Saramito	18,604	44.83	
Turnout		41,498	56.41	
UMP hold				
