= Saint-Lambert-du-Lattay =

- Part of Val-du-Layon
- Coat of arms
- Location of Saint-Lambert-du-Lattay
- Location within France Location within Pays de la Loire
- Coordinates: 47°18′11″N 0°37′52″W
- Country: France
- Region: Pays de la Loire
- Department: Maine-et-Loire
- Arrondissement: Angers
- Canton: Chemillé-Melay
- Commune: Val-du-Layon
- Area^{1}: 14.44 km^{2} (5.58 sq mi)
- Elevation: 66 m (217 ft)
- Highest elevation: 96 m (315 ft)
- Lowest elevation: 16 m (52 ft)
- Population (2022): 2,216
  - Density: 153.5/km^{2} (397.5/sq mi)
- Time zone: UTC+01:00 (CET)
  - Summer (DST): UTC+02:00 (CEST)
- Postal code: 49750
- ^{1} French Land Register data, which excludes lakes, ponds, glaciers > 1 km^{2} (0.386 sq mi or 247 acres) and river estuaries.

Saint-Lambert-du-Lattay (French pronunciation: [sɛ̃ lɑ̃bɛʁ dy latɛ]) is a former commune in the Maine-et-Loire department in western France. On 31 December 2015, it was merged into the new commune Val-du-Layon.

== Geography ==
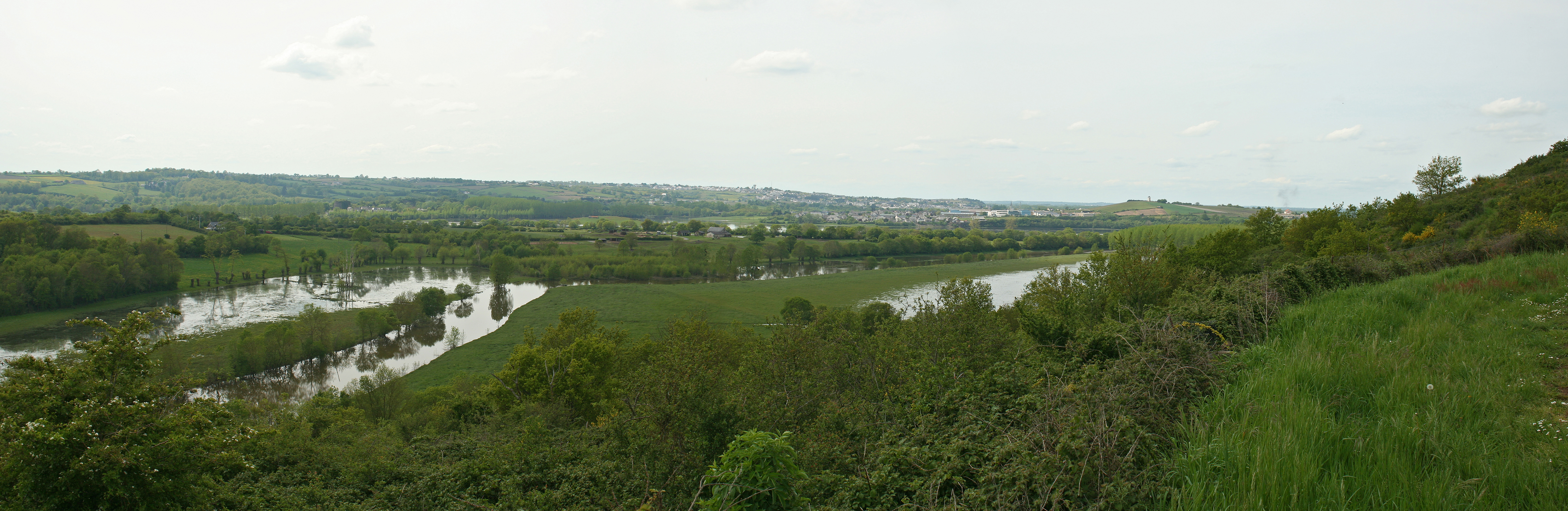
The Layon Valley

The commune is situated 28 km south-by-west of Angers on the way towards Cholet. Saint-Lambert-du-Lattay is on the south bank of the river Layon and the river Hyrôme flows through the eastern part of the village. The banks of the rivers host vineyards which are notably producing Coteaux du layon and other Anjou wines.

== History ==
War in the Vendée (1793–1796) and especially the battle of Pont-Barré took place in Saint-Lambert-du-Lattay during the French Revolution.

== Twin towns ==
- Linkebeek (Belgium) since 1981
- (United Kingdom) Kenton (England) since 1996

== Miscellaneous ==
- Patrick Dewaere (actor) is buried in the cemetery of Saint-Lambert-du-Lattay

== See also ==
- Communes of the Maine-et-Loire department
