= Chemillé-en-Anjou =

- Commune
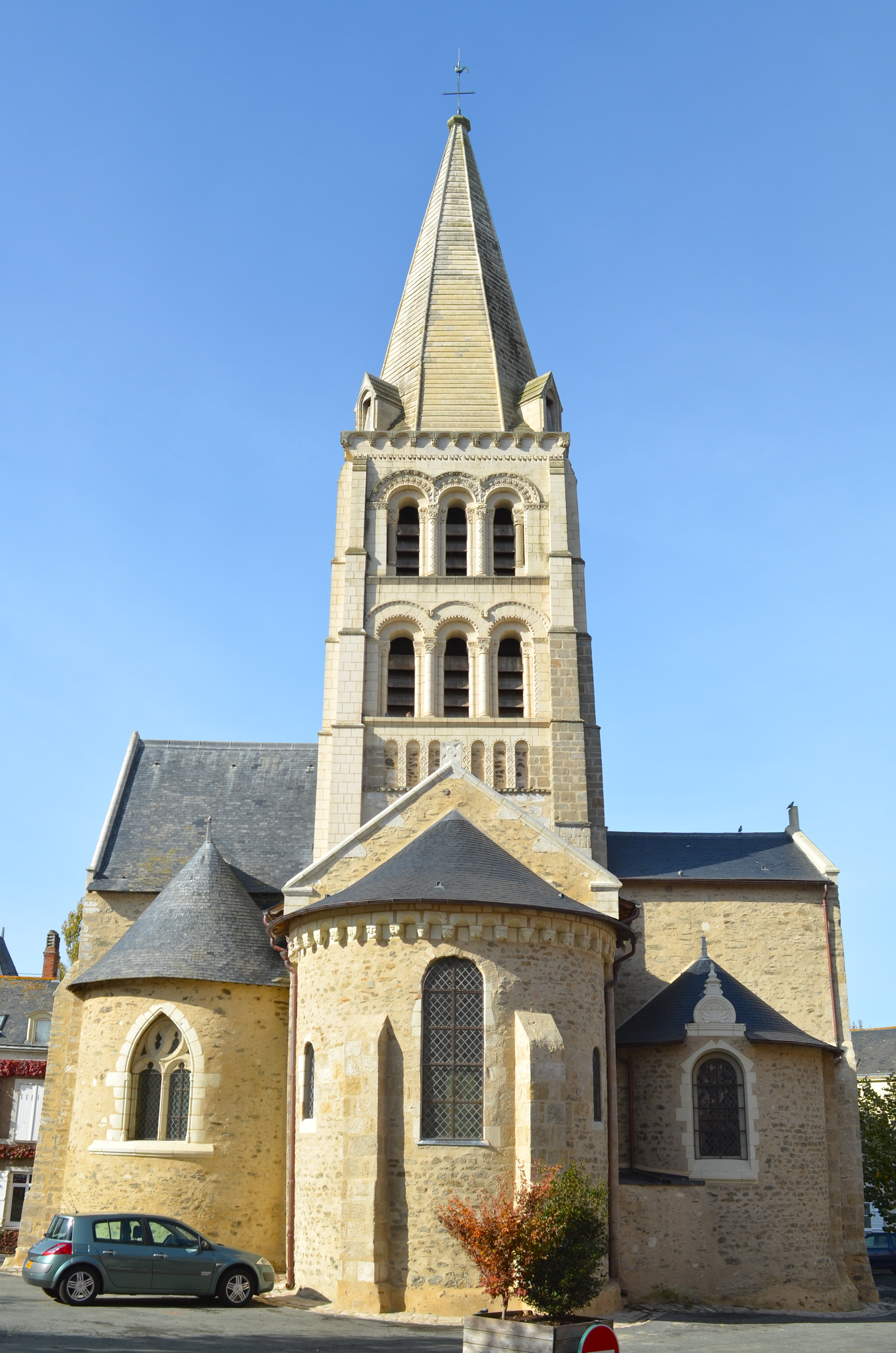
- The church in Chemillé-en-Anjou
- Location of Chemillé-en-Anjou
- Location within France Location within Pays de la Loire
- Coordinates: 47°12′36″N 0°43′43″W
- Country: France
- Region: Pays de la Loire
- Department: Maine-et-Loire
- Arrondissement: Cholet
- Canton: Chemillé-en-Anjou
- Intercommunality: Mauges Communauté

Government
  - Mayor (2026–32): Hervé Martin
- Area^{1}: 323.98 km^{2} (125.09 sq mi)
- Highest elevation: 216 m (709 ft)
- Lowest elevation: 19 m (62 ft)
- Population (2023): 21,999
  - Density: 67.902/km^{2} (175.87/sq mi)
- Time zone: UTC+01:00 (CET)
  - Summer (DST): UTC+02:00 (CEST)
- INSEE/Postal code: 49092 /49120, 49310, 49670, 49750
- ^{1} French Land Register data, which excludes lakes, ponds, glaciers > 1 km^{2} (0.386 sq mi or 247 acres) and river estuaries.

Chemillé-en-Anjou (French pronunciation: [ʃəmije ɑ̃.n‿ɑ̃ʒu], literally Chemillé in Anjou) is a commune in the Maine-et-Loire department of western France. Chemillé is the municipal seat.

== History ==
The commune was established on 15 December 2015 by the merger of the former communes of Chanzeaux, La Chapelle-Rousselin, Chemillé-Melay, Cossé-d'Anjou, La Jumellière, Neuvy-en-Mauges, Sainte-Christine, Saint-Georges-des-Gardes, Saint-Lézin, La Salle-de-Vihiers, La Tourlandry and Valanjou. Chemillé-Melay had been formed in January 2013 by the merger of the former communes of Chemillé and Melay.

The commune of Chemillé had a small fortified castle, that was destroyed in the late 1500s on order of the governor of Britain.

== Population ==
Historical population
Year	Pop.	±% p.a.
1968	15,794	—
1975	15,950	+0.14%
1982	17,098	+1.00%
1990	17,949	+0.61%
1999	18,037	+0.05%
2007	20,272	+1.47%
2012	21,114	+0.82%
2017	21,392	+0.26%
2023	21,999	+0.47%
Populations of the area corresponding with the commune of Chemillé-en-Anjou at 1 January 2025, INSEE

== See also ==
- Communes of the Maine-et-Loire department
