= Mozé-sur-Louet =

- Commune
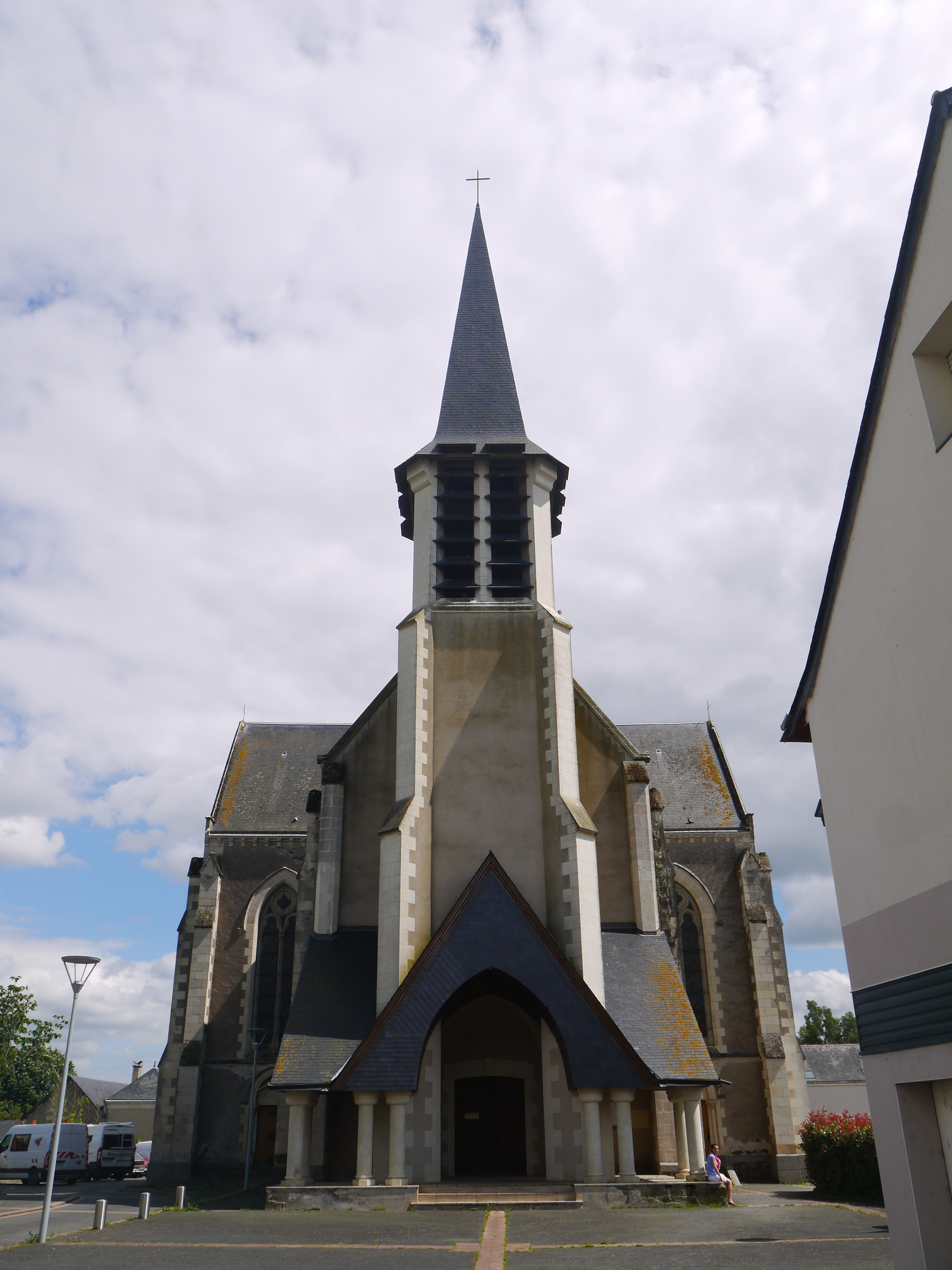
- The church of Saint-Samson in Mozé-sur-Louet

- Coat of arms
- Location of Mozé-sur-Louet
- Location within France Location within Pays de la Loire
- Coordinates: 47°21′30″N 0°33′02″W
- Country: France
- Region: Pays de la Loire
- Department: Maine-et-Loire
- Arrondissement: Angers
- Canton: Chemillé-en-Anjou
- Intercommunality: Loire Layon Aubance

Government
  - Mayor (2020–2026): Joëlle Baudonniere
- Area^{1}: 25.53 km^{2} (9.86 sq mi)
- Elevation: 23 m (75 ft)
- Highest elevation: 94 m (308 ft)
- Lowest elevation: 12 m (39 ft)
- Population (2023): 2,031
  - Density: 79.55/km^{2} (206.0/sq mi)
- Demonym(s): Mozéen, Mozéenne
- Time zone: UTC+01:00 (CET)
  - Summer (DST): UTC+02:00 (CEST)
- INSEE/Postal code: 49222 /49610
- ^{1} French Land Register data, which excludes lakes, ponds, glaciers > 1 km^{2} (0.386 sq mi or 247 acres) and river estuaries.

Mozé-sur-Louet (French pronunciation: [moze syʁ lwɛ]) is a commune in the Maine-et-Loire department in western France.

== Population ==
Historical population
Year	Pop.	±% p.a.
1968	978	—
1975	1,107	+1.79%
1982	1,434	+3.77%
1990	1,802	+2.90%
1999	2,000	+1.17%
2007	1,951	−0.31%
2012	2,050	+0.99%
2017	1,991	−0.58%
2023	2,031	+0.33%
Source: INSEE

== See also ==
- Communes of the Maine-et-Loire department
