= Jan Kwiryn de Mieszkowski =

Jan Kirwyn de Mieszkowski
- Born: 30 March 1744; Karczew, Poland
- Died: 27 February 1819 (aged 74); Wassy, France
- Military career
- Allegiance: Polish-Lithuanian Commonwealth Kingdom of France; French Republic
- Branch: Cavalry
- Rank: Marshal

Jan Kwiryn de Mieszkowski (30 March 1744 – 27 February 1819) was a Polish cavalryman and officer in the American Revolution and the French Revolution.

In 1761 he served in the Polish lancers of the Polish-Lithuanian Commonwealth. In 1766, he joined the Legion Huzarów Conflans in the service of the Kingdom of France as a Hussar, or elite horseman.

== Revolutionary War ==
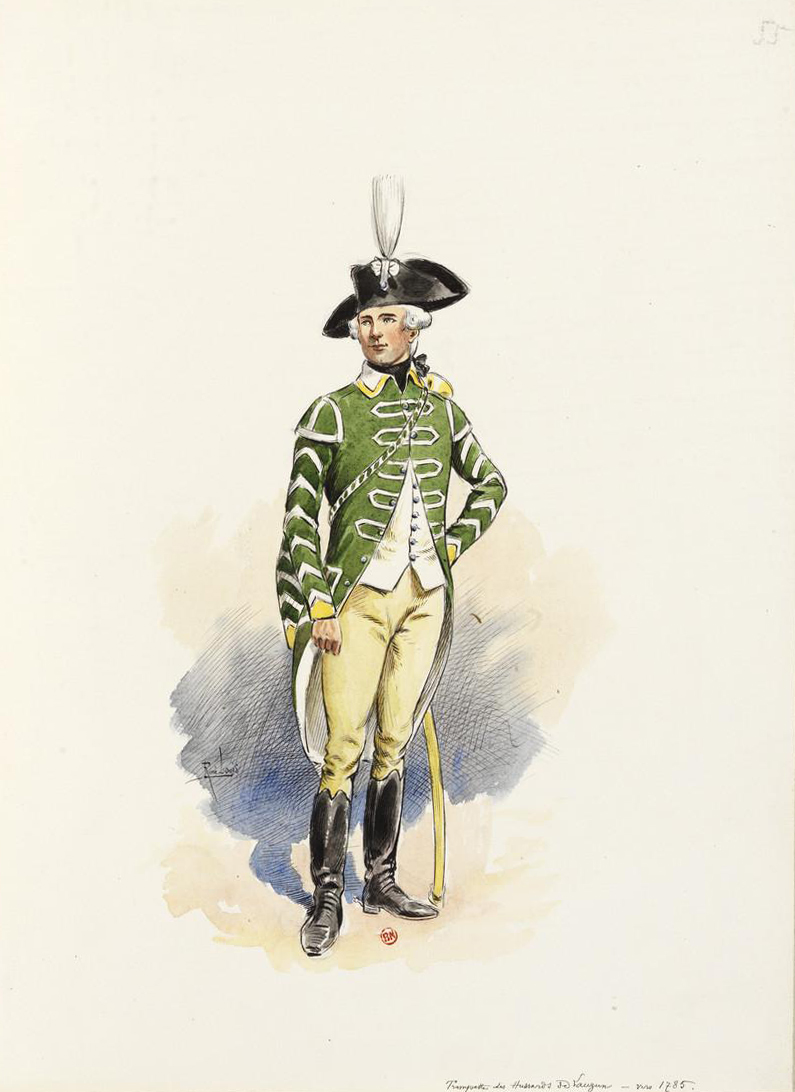
A Trumpeter of the Lauzun Legion c.1785

From 1780-1783 he participated in the Revolutionary War as the captain of the 2nd volunteer squadron of Duke de Lauzun's Volontaires Etrangeres de la Marine, later known as Lazun's Legion. The legion engaged in several minor actions while assigned picket duty for Rochambeau's army stationed in Newport, Rhode Island, later joining the Expédition Particulière.

Lazun's Legion served with distinction during the Siege of Yorktown, wounding notorious British officer Banastre Tarleton during a battle at Gloucester Point. After the battle, the Legion was headquartered in Wilmington, Delaware in 1782.

== Napoleonic Wars ==
Eventually Mieskowski returned to France. By 1792 he had been promoted to the rank of Marshal in the Army of the Rhine. In April 1793 he participated in the Italian Campaign during the War of the First Coalition.

A few months later he was assigned, but as a lower rank (Brigadier General), as commander of the Sables d'Olonne Division in the La Rochelle Coast Army. On 26 August 1793, the division under his command repulsed the attack of the Vendeeans commanded by François de Charette at La Roche-sur-Yon, but on 22 September was routed at the Battle of Saint-Fulgent by forces commanded by de Charette and Louis-Marie de Lescure.

After the defeat Mieszkowski was suspended, and he did not participate in the pacification of Vendée. He retired in 1795.
