= Saint-Maurice-Étusson =

- Commune
- Location of Saint-Maurice-Étusson
- Location within France Location within Nouvelle-Aquitaine
- Coordinates: 47°02′01″N 0°30′32″W
- Country: France
- Region: Nouvelle-Aquitaine
- Department: Deux-Sèvres
- Arrondissement: Bressuire
- Canton: Mauléon
- Intercommunality: CA Bocage Bressuirais

Government
  - Mayor (2020–2026): Pascal Lagoguée
- Area^{1}: 56.81 km^{2} (21.93 sq mi)
- Population (2023): 895
  - Density: 15.8/km^{2} (40.8/sq mi)
- Time zone: UTC+01:00 (CET)
  - Summer (DST): UTC+02:00 (CEST)
- INSEE/Postal code: 79280 /79150
- ^{1} French Land Register data, which excludes lakes, ponds, glaciers > 1 km^{2} (0.386 sq mi or 247 acres) and river estuaries.

Saint-Maurice-Étusson (French pronunciation: [sɛ̃ mɔʁis etysɔ̃]) is a commune in the Deux-Sèvres department of western France. The municipality was established on 1 January 2016 and consists of the former communes of Saint-Maurice-la-Fougereuse and Étusson.

== See also ==
- Communes of the Deux-Sèvres department
