= Charles François Duhoux =

- Born: 13 August 1736; Nancy, France
- Died: May 1799 (aged 62) Paris, France
- Allegiance: Kingdom of France; France
- Branch: Infantry, Cavalry
- Service years: (Kingdom of France) 1746–1792 (France) 1792–1795
- Rank: General of Division
- Conflicts: War of the Austrian Succession; Seven Years' War; War of the First Coalition; Siege of Lille; War in the Vendée; Battle of Chemillé; Battle of Saumur; Battle of Pont-Barré
- Awards: Order of Saint-Louis, 1761

Charles François Duhoux d'Hauterive (13 August 1736 – May 1799) fought in the War of the Austrian Succession and Seven Years' War, rising in rank to become a lieutenant colonel of cavalry. He became a French general officer during the French Revolutionary Wars. He was involved in a controversy during the 1792 Siege of Lille and later sent to fight in the War in the Vendée where he was wounded twice. After being defeated in battle by his Royalist nephew he was imprisoned but finally allowed to retire.
