= Battle of Saint-Fulgent =

Coordinates: 46°51′14″N 1°10′36″W

- Part of the War in the Vendée
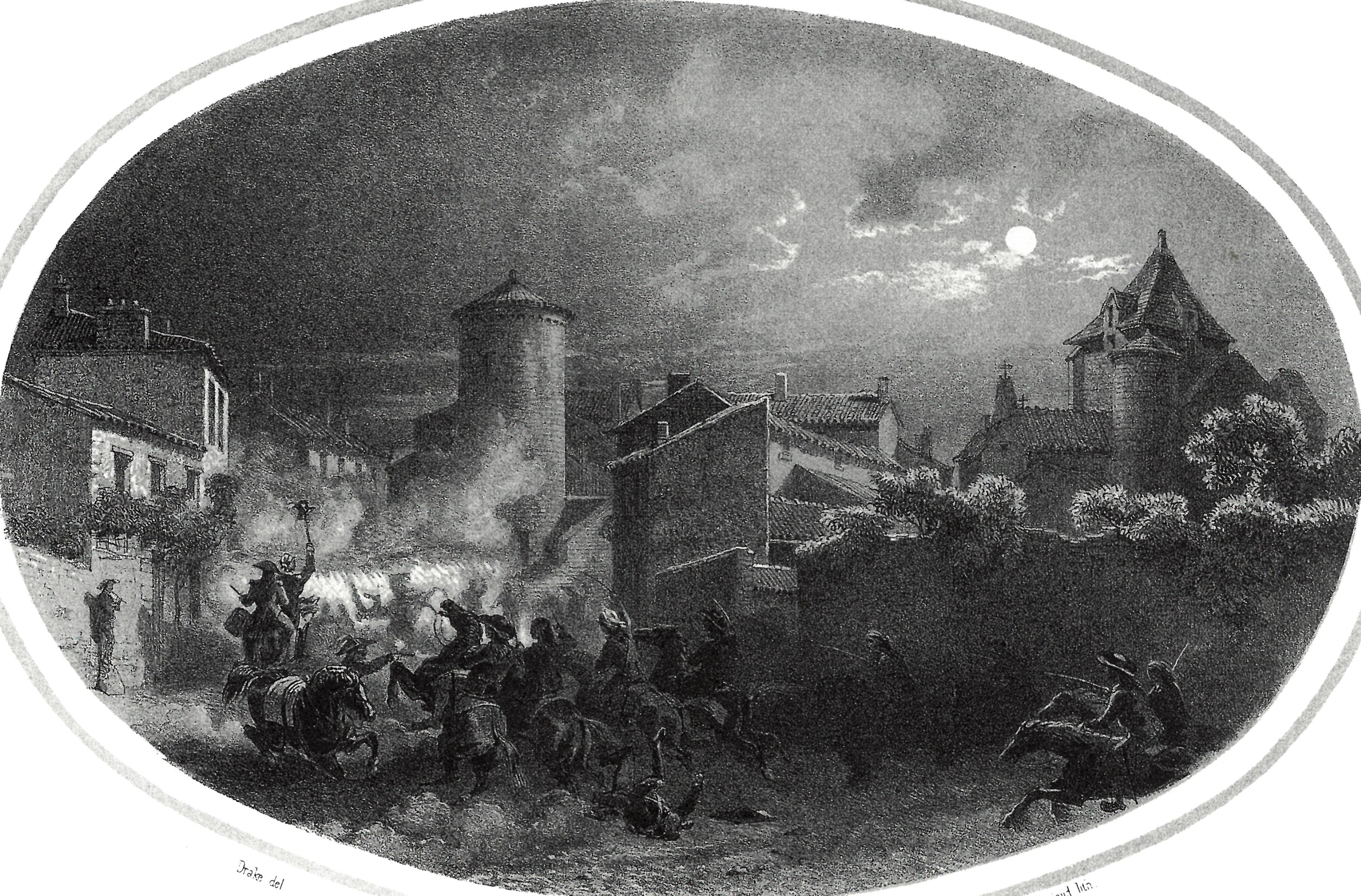
- Battle of Saint-Fulgent 1793
Date	22 September 1793
Location	Saint-Fulgent, Vendée, France
Result	Vendean victory

Belligerents
(Kingdom of France) French Royalists	Republican France

Commanders and leaders
(Kingdom of France) Henri de La Rochejaquelein	(France) Jean Rossignol (France) Jean Mieszkowski

Units involved
(Kingdom of France) Catholic and Royal Army	(France) Army of the Coasts of La Rochelle

Strength
11,000	6,000

Casualties and losses
300	3,000

The Battle of Saint-Fulgent (22 September 1793) saw Royalist and Republican French forces clash at Saint-Fulgent during the War in the Vendée. The 11,000 Vendean rebels, led by Henri de La Rochejaquelein, defeated a 6,000-man republican division, commanded by Jean Quirin de Mieszkowski and belonging to the Army of the Coasts of La Rochelle. Half of the Republican force was killed, wounded or captured, but rebel losses were only one tenth as many.

In mid-September, the Republican Army of the Coasts of La Rochelle, led by Jean Antoine Rossignol, advanced into the Vendée from the south and the east while the Army of the Coasts of Brest and the Army of Mainz, under Jean Baptiste Camille Canclaux, advanced from the west. In a series of battles at Coron, Pont-Barré, Tiffauges, Montaigu and Saint-Fulgent, the royalist rebels concentrated against and defeated each republican column in turn.
