= Saint-Aubin-de-Luigné =

- Part of Val-du-Layon
- Location of Saint-Aubin-de-Luigné
- Location within France Location within Pays de la Loire
- Coordinates: 47°19′43″N 0°39′58″W
- Country: France
- Region: Pays de la Loire
- Department: Maine-et-Loire
- Arrondissement: Angers
- Canton: Chalonnes-sur-Loire
- Commune: Val-du-Layon
- Area^{1}: 15.19 km^{2} (5.86 sq mi)
- Elevation: 20 m (66 ft)
- Highest elevation: 104 m (341 ft)
- Lowest elevation: 12 m (39 ft)
- Population (2022): 1,292
  - Density: 85.06/km^{2} (220.3/sq mi)
- Time zone: UTC+01:00 (CET)
  - Summer (DST): UTC+02:00 (CEST)
- Postal code: 49190
- ^{1} French Land Register data, which excludes lakes, ponds, glaciers > 1 km^{2} (0.386 sq mi or 247 acres) and river estuaries.

Saint-Aubin-de-Luigné (French pronunciation: [sɛ̃.t‿obɛ̃ də lɥiɲe]) is a former commune in the Maine-et-Loire department in western France. On 31 December 2015, it was merged into the new commune Val-du-Layon.

This rural village, located in the deep valley of Layon and in the Loire Valley, is classified as a UNESCO World Heritage Site. It has an important mining past linked to the exploitation of the Lower Loire Coal Basin.

A wine-growing town, its territory is located in the Coteaux du Layon appellation (AOC).

== Geography ==
This Angevin village in the west of France, is located on the northern border of the Mauges on the way from Chaudefonds-sur-Layon to Rochefort-sur-Loire.

The territory of the Mauges is a small area that covers part of southwest Maine-et-Loire bounded by the waterways of the Loire in the north and the Layon in the east.

== See also ==
- Communes of the Maine-et-Loire department
