= Étusson =

Commune in Deux-Sèvres department, France

- Part of Saint-Maurice-Étusson
- Location of Étusson
- Location within France Location within Nouvelle-Aquitaine
- Coordinates: 47°00′55″N 0°30′47″W
- Country: France
- Region: Nouvelle-Aquitaine
- Department: Deux-Sèvres
- Arrondissement: Bressuire
- Canton: Mauléon
- Commune: Saint-Maurice-Étusson
- Area^{1}: 20.97 km^{2} (8.10 sq mi)
- Elevation: 116 m (381 ft)
- Highest elevation: 156 m (512 ft)
- Lowest elevation: 93 m (305 ft)
- Population (2022): 306
  - Density: 14.6/km^{2} (37.8/sq mi)
- Time zone: UTC+01:00 (CET)
  - Summer (DST): UTC+02:00 (CEST)
- Postal code: 79150
- ^{1} French Land Register data, which excludes lakes, ponds, glaciers > 1 km^{2} (0.386 sq mi or 247 acres) and river estuaries.

Étusson (French pronunciation: [etysɔ̃]) is a former commune in the Deux-Sèvres department in western France. On 1 January 2016, it was merged into the new commune Saint-Maurice-Étusson.

Between 1962 and 2006 the registered population declined from 461 to 299, reflecting the mechanisation of agriculture the took place during the period along with the shortage of alternative employment opportunities in this part of rural France.

== See also ==
- Communes of the Deux-Sèvres department
