= Aubigné-sur-Layon =

- Commune
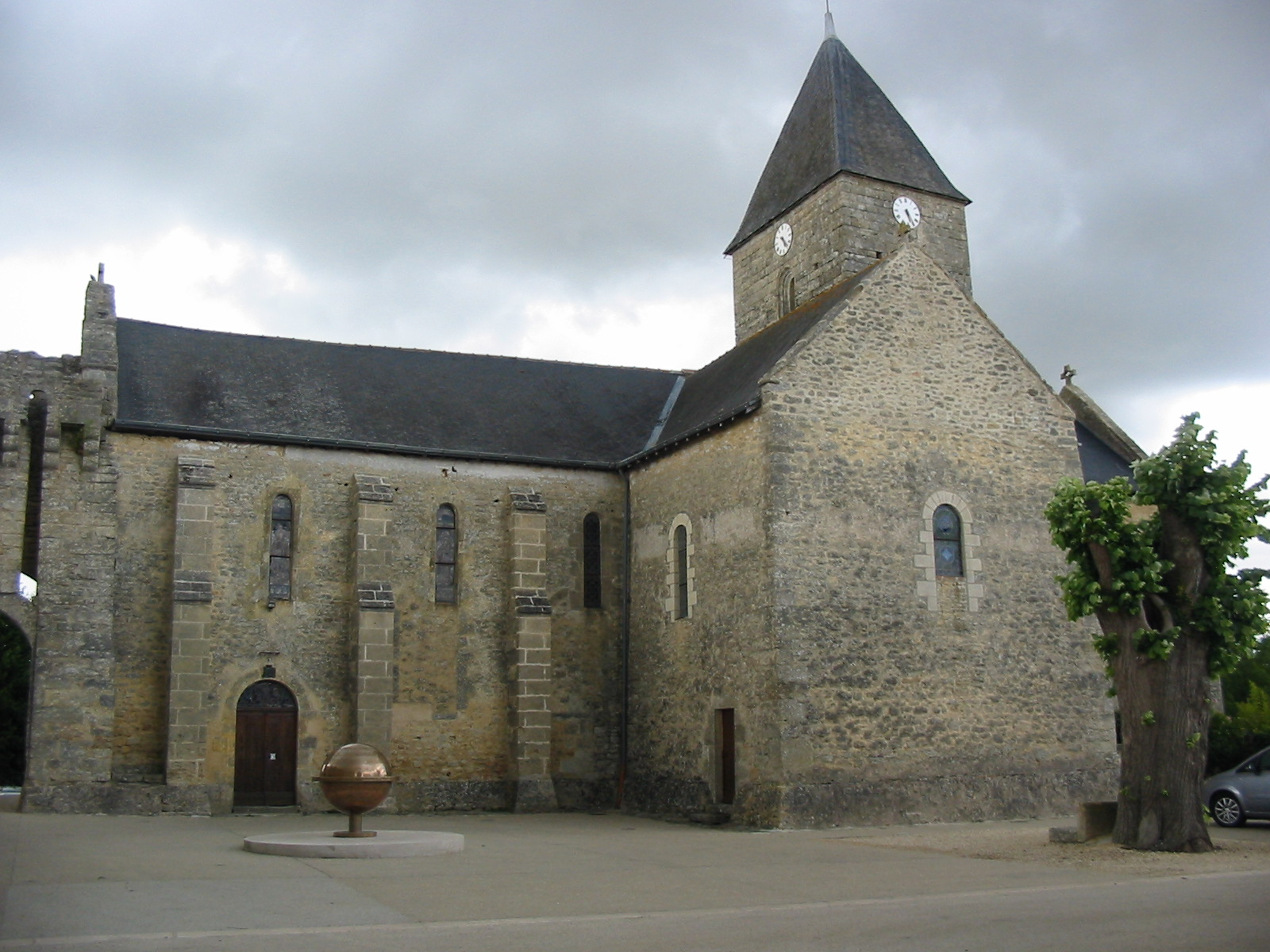
- The church in Aubigné-sur-Layon

- Coat of arms
- Location of Aubigné-sur-Layon
- Location within France Location within Pays de la Loire
- Coordinates: 47°12′46″N 0°27′35″W
- Country: France
- Region: Pays de la Loire
- Department: Maine-et-Loire
- Arrondissement: Angers
- Canton: Chemillé-en-Anjou
- Intercommunality: CC Loire Layon Aubance

Government
  - Mayor (2020–2026): Pierre Robé
- Area^{1}: 5.32 km^{2} (2.05 sq mi)
- Elevation: 44 m (144 ft)
- Highest elevation: 80 m (260 ft)
- Lowest elevation: 36 m (118 ft)
- Population (2023): 347
  - Density: 65.2/km^{2} (169/sq mi)
- Time zone: UTC+01:00 (CET)
  - Summer (DST): UTC+02:00 (CEST)
- INSEE/Postal code: 49012 /49540
- ^{1} French Land Register data, which excludes lakes, ponds, glaciers > 1 km^{2} (0.386 sq mi or 247 acres) and river estuaries.

Aubigné-sur-Layon (French pronunciation: [obiɲe syʁ lɛjɔ̃], literally Aubigné on Layon, before 1994: Aubigné-Briand) is a commune in the Maine-et-Loire department in western France.

== Geography ==
The river Layon forms all of the commune's northern border.

== Population ==
Historical population
Year	Pop.	±% p.a.
1968	324	—
1975	271	−2.52%
1982	257	−0.75%
1990	263	+0.29%
1999	334	+2.69%
2007	357	+0.84%
2012	363	+0.33%
2017	366	+0.16%
2023	347	−0.88%
Source: INSEE

== See also ==
- Communes of the Maine-et-Loire department
