= Melay, Maine-et-Loire =

Melay
- Part of Chemillé-en-Anjou
- Coat of arms
- Location of Melay
- Location within France Location within Pays de la Loire
- Coordinates: 47°10′57″N 0°41′47″W
- Country: France
- Region: Pays de la Loire
- Department: Maine-et-Loire
- Arrondissement: Cholet
- Canton: Chemillé-Melay
- Commune: Chemillé-en-Anjou
- Area^{1}: 22.7 km^{2} (8.8 sq mi)
- Highest elevation: 212 m (696 ft)
- Lowest elevation: 75 m (246 ft)
- Population (2022): 1,608
  - Density: 70.8/km^{2} (183/sq mi)
- Time zone: UTC+01:00 (CET)
  - Summer (DST): UTC+02:00 (CEST)
- Postal code: 49120
- ^{1} French Land Register data, which excludes lakes, ponds, glaciers > 1 km^{2} (0.386 sq mi or 247 acres) and river estuaries.

Melay (French pronunciation: [məlɛ]) is a former commune in the Maine-et-Loire department in western France. In 2013 it became part of the new commune Chemillé-Melay, which became part of Chemillé-en-Anjou in December 2015. Its population was 1,608 in 2022.

== See also ==
- Communes of the Maine-et-Loire department
