= Bellevigne-en-Layon =

- Commune
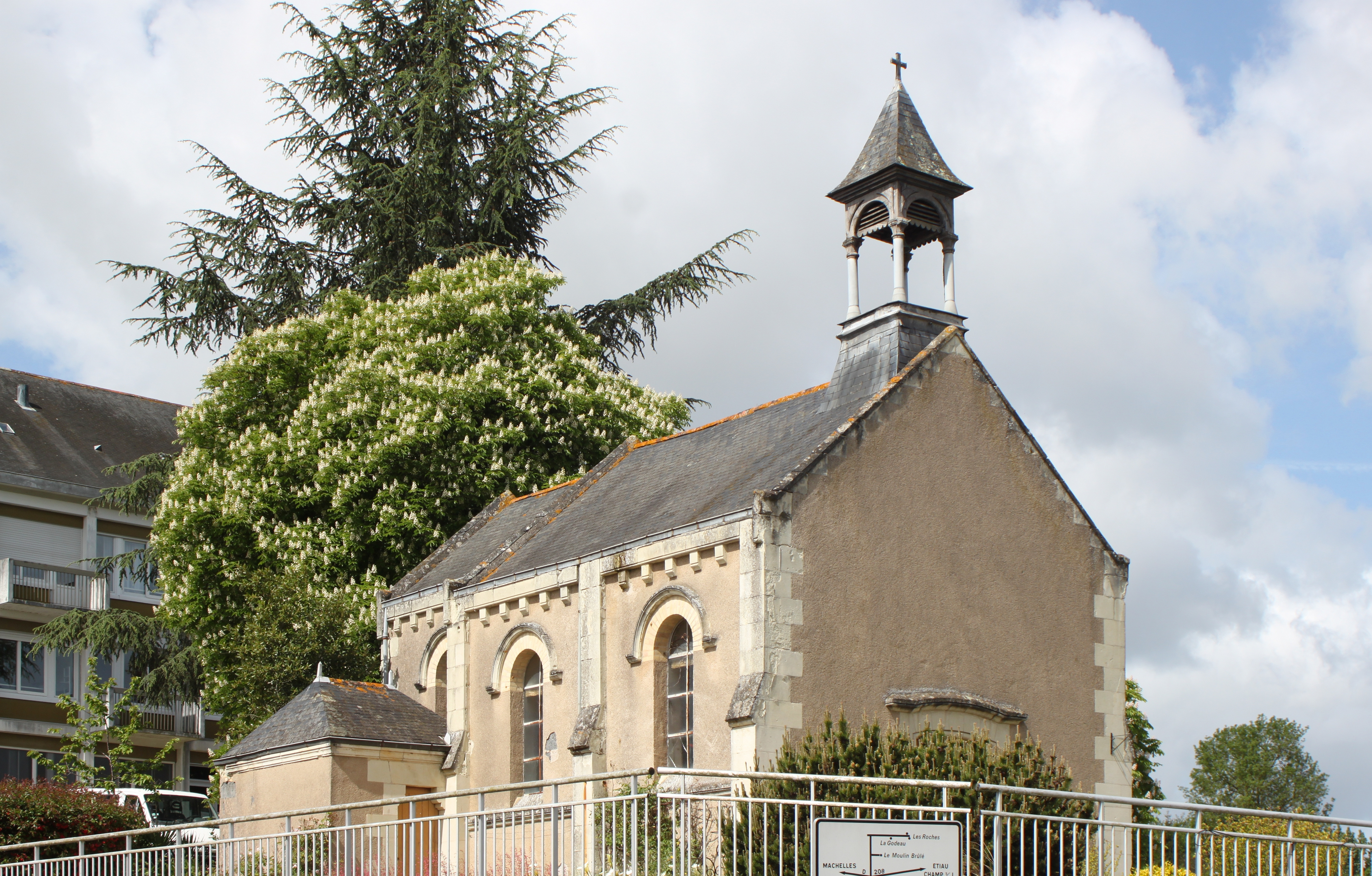
- Chapel of the retirement home of Thouarcé
- Location of Bellevigne-en-Layon
- Location within France Location within Pays de la Loire
- Coordinates: 47°16′01″N 0°30′11″W
- Country: France
- Region: Pays de la Loire
- Department: Maine-et-Loire
- Arrondissement: Angers
- Canton: Chemillé-en-Anjou

Government
  - Mayor (2020–2026): Jean-Yves Le Bars
- Area^{1}: 94.37 km^{2} (36.44 sq mi)
- Population (2023): 5,922
  - Density: 62.75/km^{2} (162.5/sq mi)
- Time zone: UTC+01:00 (CET)
  - Summer (DST): UTC+02:00 (CEST)
- INSEE/Postal code: 49345 /49380, 49750
- ^{1} French Land Register data, which excludes lakes, ponds, glaciers > 1 km^{2} (0.386 sq mi or 247 acres) and river estuaries.

Bellevigne-en-Layon (French pronunciation: [bɛlviɲ ɑ̃ lɛjɔ̃]) is a commune in the Maine-et-Loire department of western France. The municipality was established on 1 January 2016 and consists of the former communes of Thouarcé, Champ-sur-Layon, Faveraye-Mâchelles, Faye-d'Anjou and Rablay-sur-Layon.

== Population ==
The population data given in the table below refer to the commune in its geography as of January 2025.

Historical population
Year	Pop.	±% p.a.
1968	4,575	—
1975	4,235	−1.10%
1982	4,253	+0.06%
1990	4,296	+0.13%
1999	4,648	+0.88%
2007	5,302	+1.66%
2012	5,648	+1.27%
2017	5,730	+0.29%
2023	5,922	+0.55%
Source: INSEE

== See also ==
- Communes of the Maine-et-Loire department
