= Louis Aubeux =

French organist

Canon Louis Aubeux (1917 – 8 July 1999) was a French ecclesiastic and organist.

== Life ==
Born in Beaulieu-sur-Layon, Aubeux studied at the École César Franck. Auguste Fauchard, André Marchal and Marcel Dupré were among his music masters.

He was ordained priest on 29 June 1942 and was titular organist of the Saint-Maurice d'Angers Cathedral from 1947 to 1998. An organ expert, he was in particular a corresponding member of the High Commission of Historical Monuments. He was also director of the Revue de Musique Sacrée and author of a book on the facture: L'Orgue - Sa Facture. He also composed some pieces for the organ.

Elizabeth Hériobé-Pineau was his assistant on the great organ for more than twenty years. Very brilliant, she was the only assistant to the titular. She played the harpsichord and piano. During this period, she organized about ten organ recitals per year, and brought in many organists (J.Beck, American organist, Canadian J.Boucher, Gaston Litaize, Rolande Falcinelli, M.J. Chassegay, holder of the order of the cathedral of Le Mans, etc).

Canon Aubeux also conducted a large choir (chorale Plantagenêt). Elizabeth Hériobé-Pineau set up many oratorios (Judas Maccabaeus, Israel in Egypt, a Missa Solemnis, the St John Passion etc). This choir was accompanied by the French Republican Guard Band.

Canon Aubeux had a tragic end, forgotten by all, despite his 50 years on the organ of the cathedral of Angers with a magnificent repertoire since he had a liturgical formation. His assistant, while he had been placed with the Little Sisters of the Poor, continued to care for him until his death in Angers.

== Publications ==
- L'Orgue - Sa Facture, Angers, 1971.
