= Val-du-Layon =

- Commune
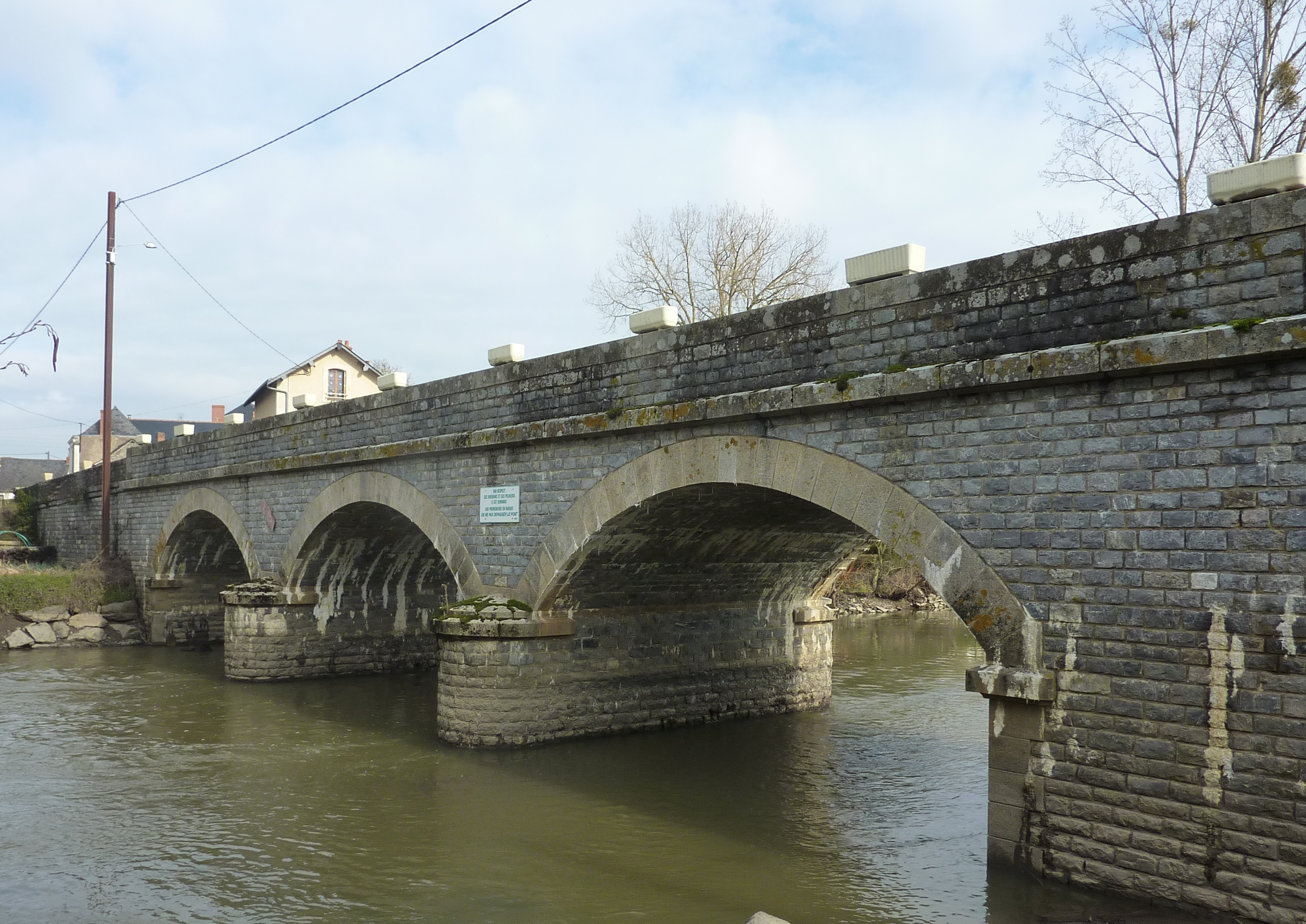
- The Saint-Aubin-de-Luigné bridge
- Location of Val-du-Layon
- Location within France Location within Pays de la Loire
- Coordinates: 47°18′11″N 0°37′52″W
- Country: France
- Region: Pays de la Loire
- Department: Maine-et-Loire
- Arrondissement: Angers
- Canton: Chemillé-en-Anjou

Government
  - Mayor (2020–2026): Sandrine Belleut
- Area^{1}: 29.63 km^{2} (11.44 sq mi)
- Population (2023): 3,510
  - Density: 118/km^{2} (307/sq mi)
- Time zone: UTC+01:00 (CET)
  - Summer (DST): UTC+02:00 (CEST)
- INSEE/Postal code: 49292 /49750, 49190
- ^{1} French Land Register data, which excludes lakes, ponds, glaciers > 1 km^{2} (0.386 sq mi or 247 acres) and river estuaries.

Val-du-Layon (French pronunciation: [val dy lɛjɔ̃]) is a commune in the Maine-et-Loire department of western France. Saint-Lambert-du-Lattay is the municipal seat.

== History ==
It was established on 31 December 2015 and consists of the former communes of Saint-Aubin-de-Luigné and Saint-Lambert-du-Lattay.

== Population ==
Population data refer to the area corresponding with the commune as of January 2025.

Historical population
Year	Pop.	±% p.a.
1968	2,120	—
1975	2,079	−0.28%
1982	2,061	−0.12%
1990	2,205	+0.85%
1999	2,323	+0.58%
2007	2,772	+2.23%
2012	3,216	+3.02%
2017	3,402	+1.13%
2023	3,510	+0.52%
Source: INSEE

== See also ==
- Communes of the Maine-et-Loire department
