= Laetitia Saint-Paul =

French politician

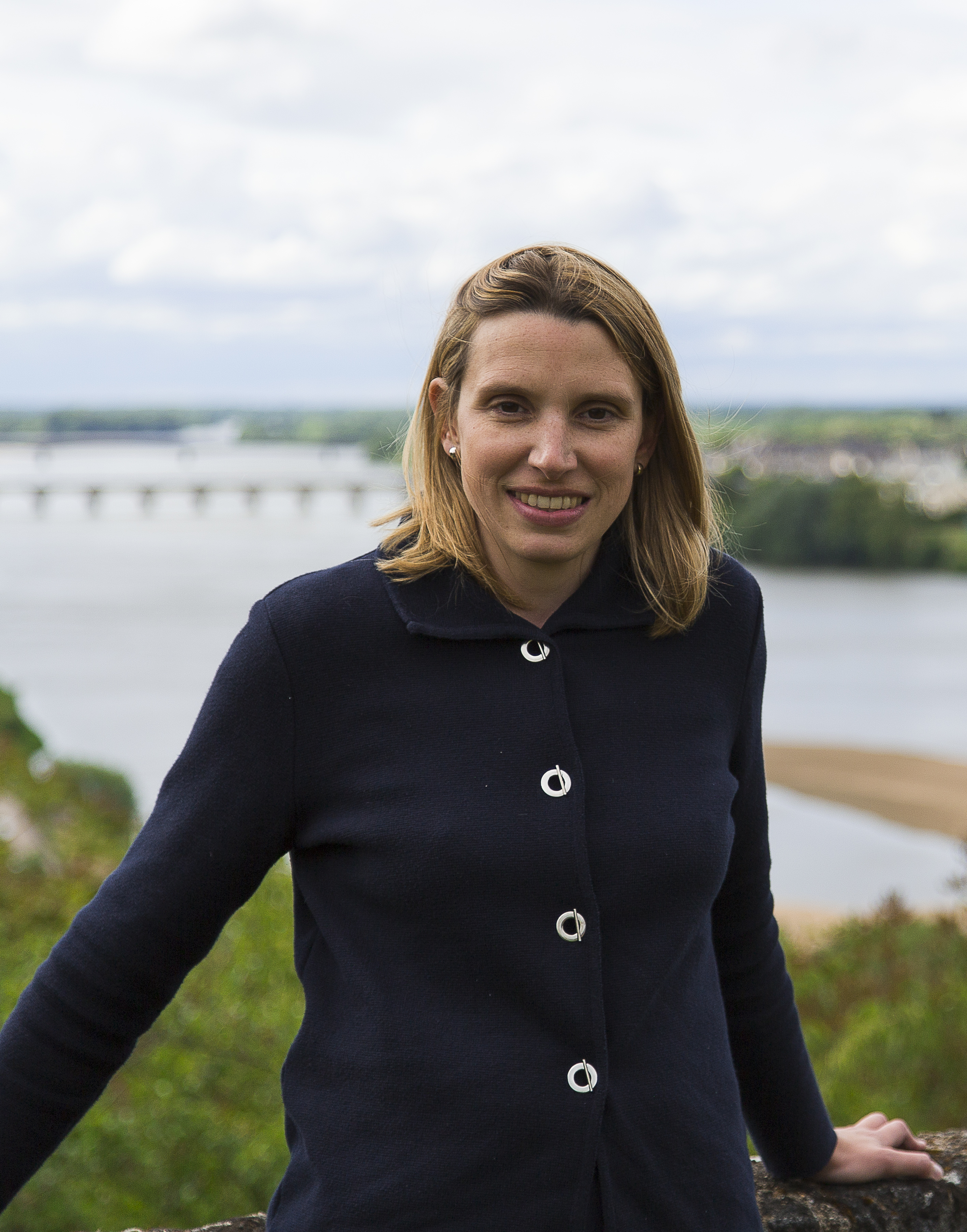

Member of the National Assembly for Maine-et-Loire's 4th constituency
- Incumbent
- Assumed office 21 June 2017
- Preceded by: Michel Piron

Personal details
- Born: 21 January 1981 (age 45) Chartres, France
- Party: La République En Marche!
- Education: École spéciale militaire de Saint-Cyr

Laetitia Rachèle Saint-Paul (née Bruneau, 21 January 1981) is a French politician and army officer who has represented the 4th constituency of the Maine-et-Loire department in the National Assembly since 2017. A member of La République En Marche! (LREM), she sits on the Committee on Foreign Affairs in Parliament.

== Military career ==
Before entering politics, Saint-Paul commanded a company in the joint Franco-German Brigade as an army major.

== Political career ==
In the 2017 legislative election, she was elected to the National Assembly in the 4th constituency of Maine-et-Loire with 58.2% of the second-round vote. She succeeded Michel Piron of the Union of Democrats and Independents (UDI), who did not seek reelection.

In Parliament, Saint-Paul serves as member of the Committee on Foreign Affairs, where she coordinates the activities of her parliamentary group. In addition to her committee assignments, she is a member of the French parliamentary friendship groups with China, Lebanon and Mali. Since 2019, she has also been a member of the French delegation to the Franco-German Parliamentary Assembly.

Also in 2019, Saint-Paul replaced Carole Bureau-Bonnard in her position as one of six vice presidents of the National Assembly, under the leadership of President Richard Ferrand. From 2017 to 2022, she was also one of six National Assembly members who served as judges of the Cour de Justice de la République (CJR).

In the 2022 legislative election, she was reelected to Parliament with 60.3% of the second-round vote.

== Political positions ==
Saint-Paul is considered to be part of her parliamentary group's conservative wing.

In July 2019, Saint-Paul voted in favour of the French ratification of the European Union's Comprehensive Economic and Trade Agreement (CETA) with Canada.

== Other engagements ==
She is a Senior Network Member at the European Leadership Network (ELN).

== See also ==
- 2017 French legislative election
