= Saint-Maurice-la-Fougereuse =

- Part of Saint-Maurice-Étusson
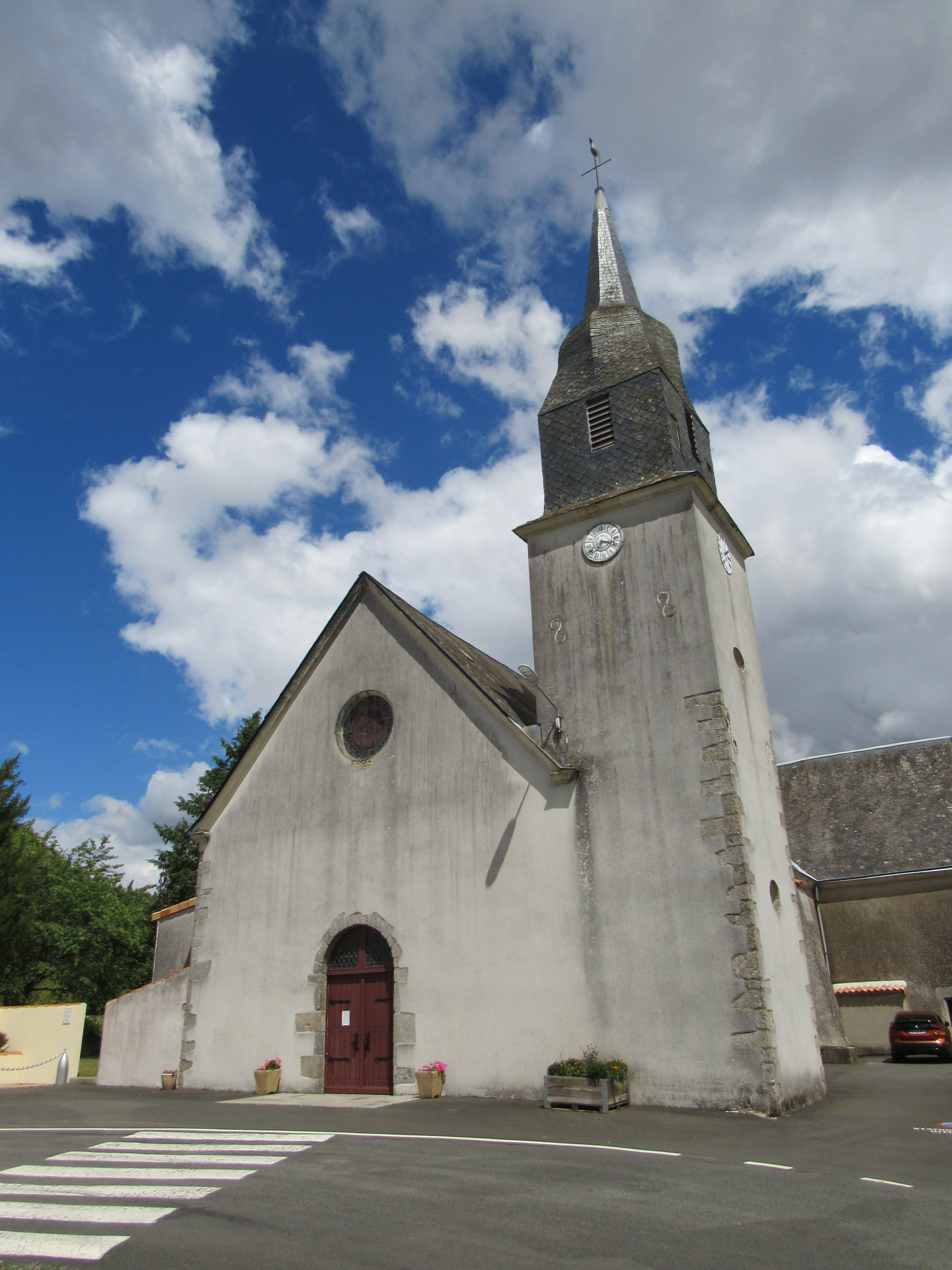
- Saint-Maurice Church
- Location of Saint-Maurice-la-Fougereuse
- Location within France Location within Nouvelle-Aquitaine
- Coordinates: 47°02′04″N 0°30′28″W
- Country: France
- Region: Nouvelle-Aquitaine
- Department: Deux-Sèvres
- Arrondissement: Bressuire
- Canton: Mauléon
- Commune: Saint-Maurice-Étusson
- Area^{1}: 35.84 km^{2} (13.84 sq mi)
- Elevation: 150 m (490 ft)
- Highest elevation: 174 m (571 ft)
- Lowest elevation: 84 m (276 ft)
- Population (2022): 582
  - Density: 16.2/km^{2} (42.1/sq mi)
- Time zone: UTC+01:00 (CET)
  - Summer (DST): UTC+02:00 (CEST)
- Postal code: 79150
- ^{1} French Land Register data, which excludes lakes, ponds, glaciers > 1 km^{2} (0.386 sq mi or 247 acres) and river estuaries.

Saint-Maurice-la-Fougereuse (French pronunciation: [sɛ̃ mɔʁis la fuʒʁøz]) is a former commune in the Deux-Sèvres department in western France. On 1 January 2016, it was merged into the new commune Saint-Maurice-Étusson.

== Geography ==
The Layon has its source in the commune.

== See also ==
- Communes of the Deux-Sèvres department
