= Chalonnes-sur-Loire =

- Commune
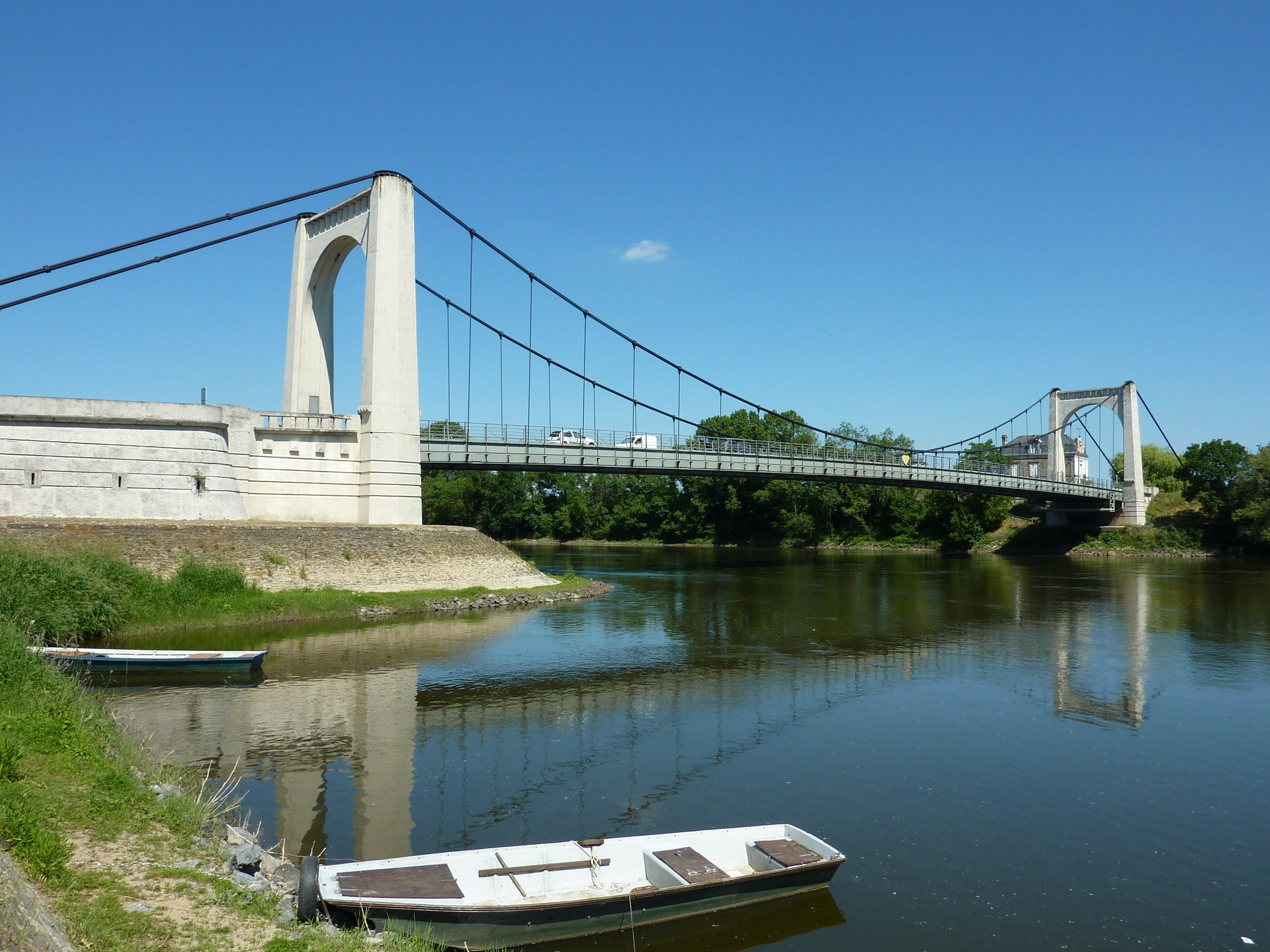
- The Chalonnes-sur-Loire bridge

- Coat of arms
- Location of Chalonnes-sur-Loire
- Location within France Location within Pays de la Loire
- Coordinates: 47°21′05″N 0°45′45″W
- Country: France
- Region: Pays de la Loire
- Department: Maine-et-Loire
- Arrondissement: Angers
- Canton: Chalonnes-sur-Loire

Government
  - Mayor (2020–2026): Marie-Madeleine Monnier
- Area^{1}: 38.56 km^{2} (14.89 sq mi)
- Elevation: 28 m (92 ft)
- Highest elevation: 99 m (325 ft)
- Lowest elevation: 10 m (33 ft)
- Population (2023): 6,659
  - Density: 172.7/km^{2} (447.3/sq mi)
- Time zone: UTC+01:00 (CET)
  - Summer (DST): UTC+02:00 (CEST)
- INSEE/Postal code: 49063 /49290
- ^{1} French Land Register data, which excludes lakes, ponds, glaciers > 1 km^{2} (0.386 sq mi or 247 acres) and river estuaries.

Chalonnes-sur-Loire is a commune in the Maine-et-Loire department in western France. It is located on the left bank of the river Loire in the Loire Valley UNESCO World Heritage Site area.

== Geography ==
The town is in the heart of the Anjou, a historical agricultural region southwest of Angers renowned for Loire Valley wines. The Layon flows into the Loire at the commune.

The airport nearest to Chalonnes-sur-Loire for regional flights is Angers – Loire Airport (41 km), and for international flights is Nantes Atlantique Airport (67 km).

== Population ==
Historical population
Year	Pop.	±% p.a.
1968	4,259	—
1975	4,682	+1.36%
1982	5,281	+1.73%
1990	5,354	+0.17%
1999	5,594	+0.49%
2007	6,137	+1.16%
2012	6,550	+1.31%
2017	6,535	−0.05%
2023	6,659	+0.31%
Source: INSEE

== Twin towns ==
Chalonnes-sur-Loire is twinned with:

- Tecklenburg, North Rhine-Westphalia, Germany (since 1982)
- Sanniki, Masovian Voivodeship, Poland
- (Republic of Ireland) Ballinasloe, County Galway, Ireland

== See also ==
- Communes of the Maine-et-Loire department
- Passage SAS
