= Chaudefonds-sur-Layon =

- Commune
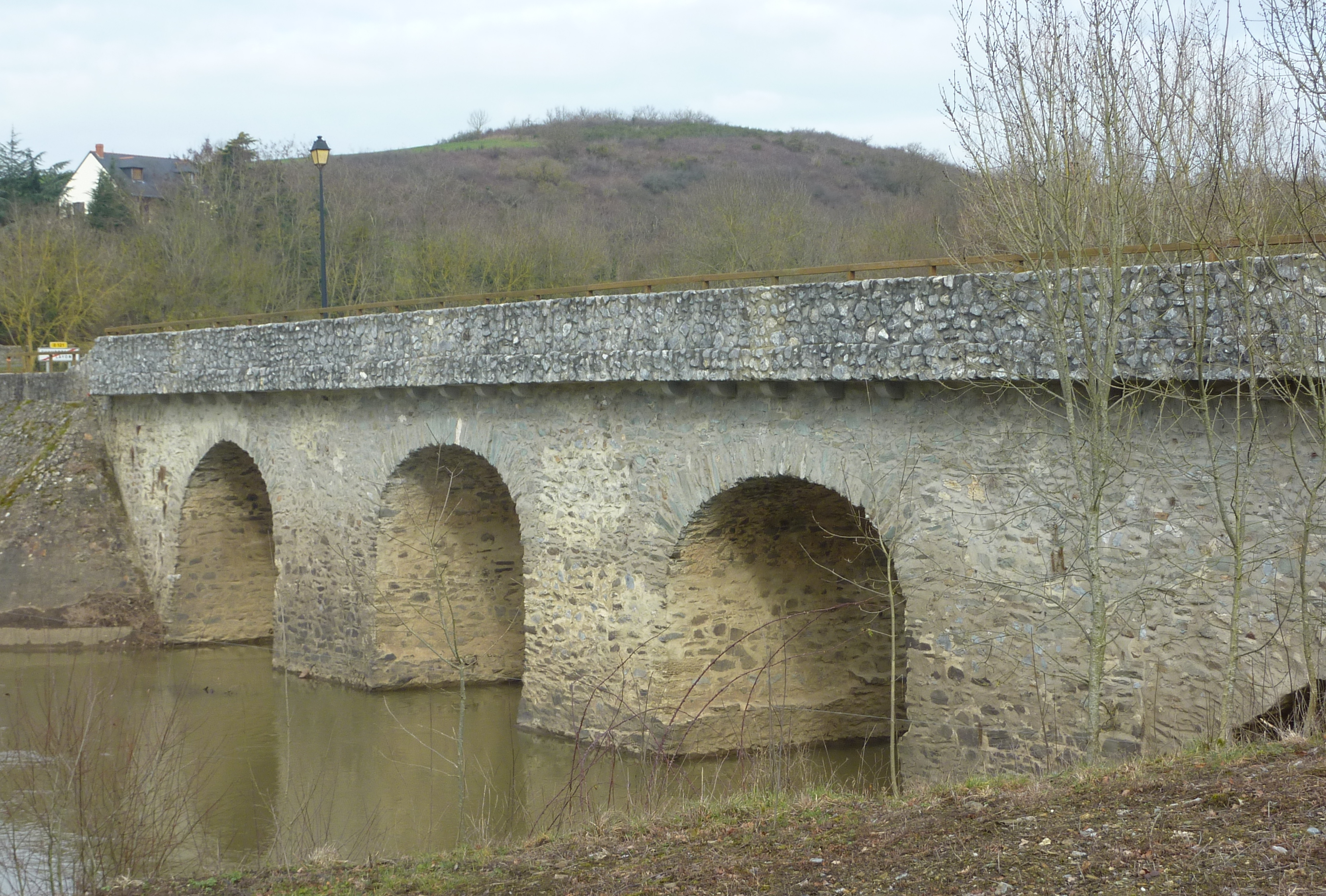
- The bridge of Chaudefonds-sur-Layon
- Location of Chaudefonds-sur-Layon
- Location within France Location within Pays de la Loire
- Coordinates: 47°19′37″N 0°42′17″W
- Country: France
- Region: Pays de la Loire
- Department: Maine-et-Loire
- Arrondissement: Angers
- Canton: Chalonnes-sur-Loire
- Intercommunality: Loire Layon Aubance

Government
  - Mayor (2020–2026): Yves Berland
- Area^{1}: 14.77 km^{2} (5.70 sq mi)
- Elevation: 29 m (95 ft)
- Highest elevation: 95 m (312 ft)
- Lowest elevation: 12 m (39 ft)
- Population (2023): 949
  - Density: 64.3/km^{2} (166/sq mi)
- Demonym(s): Califontain, Califontaine
- Time zone: UTC+01:00 (CET)
  - Summer (DST): UTC+02:00 (CEST)
- INSEE/Postal code: 49082 /49290
- ^{1} French Land Register data, which excludes lakes, ponds, glaciers > 1 km^{2} (0.386 sq mi or 247 acres) and river estuaries.

Chaudefonds-sur-Layon (French pronunciation: [ʃodfɔ̃ syʁ lɛjɔ̃], literally Chaudefonds on Layon) is a commune in the Maine-et-Loire department of western France.

== Geography ==
The commune is traversed by the river Layon.

== See also ==
- Communes of the Maine-et-Loire department
