= Thouarcé =

- Part of Bellevigne-en-Layon
- Location of Thouarcé
- Location within France Location within Pays de la Loire
- Coordinates: 47°16′04″N 0°29′55″W
- Country: France
- Region: Pays de la Loire
- Department: Maine-et-Loire
- Arrondissement: Angers
- Canton: Chemillé-Melay
- Commune: Bellevigne-en-Layon
- Area^{1}: 18.74 km^{2} (7.24 sq mi)
- Highest elevation: 98 m (322 ft)
- Lowest elevation: 23 m (75 ft)
- Population (2022): 1,989
  - Density: 106.1/km^{2} (274.9/sq mi)
- Demonym(s): Thouarcéen, Thouarcéenne
- Time zone: UTC+01:00 (CET)
  - Summer (DST): UTC+02:00 (CEST)
- Postal code: 49380
- Website: www.thouarce.fr
- ^{1} French Land Register data, which excludes lakes, ponds, glaciers > 1 km^{2} (0.386 sq mi or 247 acres) and river estuaries.

Thouarcé (French pronunciation: [twaʁse]) is a former commune in the Maine-et-Loire department in western France. On 1 January 2016, it was merged into the new commune of Bellevigne-en-Layon.

== Geography ==
The commune is traversed by the river Layon.

== See also ==
- Communes of the Maine-et-Loire department
