= Canton of Chemillé-en-Anjou =

Coordinates: 47°12′55″N 0°45′13″W

Chemillé-en-Anjou
- Canton
- Country: France
- Region: Pays de la Loire
- Department: Maine-et-Loire
- No. of communes: {{{nbcomm}}}
- Area: 533.47 km^{2} (205.97 sq mi)
- Population (2023): 39,025
  - Density: 73.153/km^{2} (189.47/sq mi)
- INSEE code: 4911

Canton of Chemillé-en-Anjou (before 2015: Canton of Chemillé, between 2015 and March 2020: Canton of Chemillé-Melay) is a canton of France, located in the Maine-et-Loire department, in the Pays de la Loire region. At the French canton reorganisation which came into effect in March 2015, the canton was renamed and expanded from 9 to 24 communes (19 of which merged into the new communes of Chemillé-en-Anjou, Bellevigne-en-Layon and Terranjou in December 2015, January 2016 and January 2017):

- Aubigné-sur-Layon
- Beaulieu-sur-Layon
- Bellevigne-en-Layon
- Chemillé-en-Anjou
- Mozé-sur-Louet
- Terranjou
- Val-du-Layon

== See also ==
- Cantons of the Maine-et-Loire department
- Communes of the Maine-et-Loire department
