= Jef Murray =

American fantasy artist and author

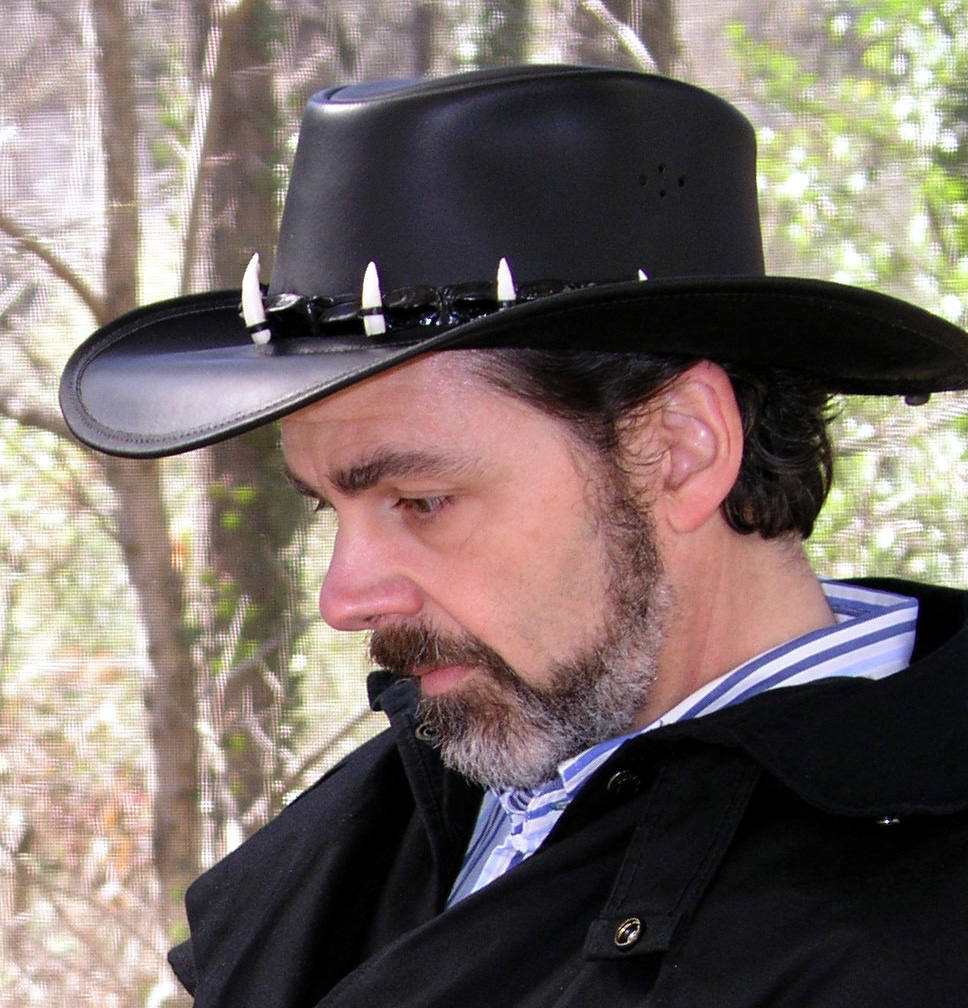
Jef Murray

Jeffrey Patrick Murray (March 17, 1960 – August 3, 2015) was an American fantasy artist and author best known for his illustrations of works by J.R.R. Tolkien and C.S. Lewis. His paintings, illustrations, stories, poems, and essays appear regularly in Tolkien and Inklings-oriented publications (Amon Hen, Mallorn, and Silver Leaves) and in Catholic publications (St. Austin Review and the Georgia Bulletin) worldwide. He was Artist-in-Residence for the St. Austin Review, and was artist guest of honor at the 2006 Gathering of the Fellowship in Toronto along with Ted Nasmith. He was nominated for an Imperishable Flame award in 2006, and his work has been exhibited in the USA, Canada, the UK, and the Netherlands.

== Bibliography ==
- Murray, Jef (May 2012). Seer: A Wizard's Journal. Grail Quest Books. p. 172. ISBN 978-0983548829.
- Fouque, Baron de la Motte; Sturgis, Amy; Murray, Jef (June 2010). The Magic Ring: Deluxe Illustrated Edition. Valancourt Books. p. 454. ISBN 978-1-934555-98-9.
- Tolkien, Hilary; Gardner, Angela; Murray, Jef (January 2009). Black & White Ogre Country: The Lost Tales of Hilary Tolkien. ADC Publications. p. 96. ISBN 978-0-9551900-2-5.
- Pearce, Joseph; Murray, Jef (April 2008). Divining Divinity. Kaufmann Publishing. p. 43. ISBN 978-0-9768580-1-0.
- Murray, Lorraine; Murray, Jef (March 2005). How Shall We Celebrate: Embracing Jesus in Every Season. Resurrection Press. p. 110. ISBN 978-1-878718-97-6.
- Murray, Jef (2016). The Framerunners: In the Company of Angels. Oloris Publishing. ISBN 978-1-940992-53-2.

== See also ==
- Works inspired by J. R. R. Tolkien
