= Lionel Johnson =

English Poet

- Born: 15 March 1867; Broadstairs, Kent
- Died: 4 October 1902 (aged 35); London
- Occupations: Poet; essayist; critic

Lionel Pigot Johnson (15 March 1867 – 4 October 1902) was an English poet, essayist, and critic.

Claiming Irish descent, Johnson also wrote on Celtic themes.

== Life ==
Johnson was born in Broadstairs, Kent, England, in 1867, and educated at Winchester College. While there, he befriended Frank Russell. The two started a lengthy religious discussion that Russell later published as Some Winchester Letters of Lionel Johnson (1919).

Johnson graduated from New College, Oxford, in 1890 and converted to the Church of Rome in June 1891. At about that time, Johnson introduced Lord Alfred Douglas to his friend Oscar Wilde. Johnson later denounced Wilde in "The Destroyer of a Soul" (1892) and deeply regretted that he had unwittingly initiated Wilde's homosexual relationship which later developed into a public scandal.

In 1893, Johnson published what some consider his greatest work, "Dark Angel". During his lifetime, he published: The Art of Thomas Hardy (1894), Poems (1895), and Ireland and Other Poems (1897). Johnson was a member of the Rhymers' Club, and a cousin of Olivia Shakespear (who dedicated her novel The False Laurel to him).

Johnson died of a "cerebral haemorrhage", according to an inquest on 8 October 1902, after collapsing in the Green Dragon public house on Fleet Street, London. The story of Johnson's being killed by being struck by a hansom cab is a myth.

=== Legacy ===
- In October 2018, Strange Attractor Press published Incurable: The Haunted Writings of Lionel Johnson, the Decadent Era's Dark Angel, edited by Nina Antonia.
- Duncan Fallowell included Incurable in his list of books for the books of the year section (2018) in The Spectator.
- Michael Dirda, in his 5 December 2018 book review for the Washington Post, entitled "The '90s are having a literary moment. That is, the 1890s... " recommended Incurable as a must read.
- Eric Hoffman reviewed Incurable in the Fortean Times on 25 February 2019, saying, "This handsome volume from the excellent Strange Attractor Press includes a lengthy, authoritative introduction by Antonia, which provides biographical and critical contexts...Incurable is an accessible introduction to the work of this minor, yet distinctive, poet."
- On 1 May 2019 Alan Contreras reviewed Incurable in the Gay and Lesbian Review, saying Johnson's: "writing conjured worlds of the imagination" and called Nina Antonia's illustrated biography "masterful, gorgeously written and packed with carefully researched gossip."
- In the Warhammer 40,000 universe, the Dark Angels chapter of Space Marines are led by their primarch, Lion El’Jonson. These names reference Johnson himself and “The Dark Angel”, a poem which portrays his homosexuality as a hidden force which he must secretly struggle with in order to stay faithful to his religious beliefs. The chapter and its successors are constantly engaged in a clandestine campaign, hunting down and eliminating members who betrayed them during the Horus Heresy. Notably, the existence of these traitors, as well as knowledge of the betrayal itself, are closely guarded secrets.
- Robert Asch, ed. Lionel Johnson: Poetry and Prose. Saint Austin Press, 2021. ISBN 978-1919673004.

== Bibliography ==
- Twenty one poems written by Lionel Johnson, selected by William Butler Yeats (Dun Emer Press, 1904) online text
- Some Winchester Letters of Lionel Johnson, (George Allen & Unwin, London, 1919.)
- The collected poems of Lionel Johnson (1953) edited by Ian Fletcher, Unicorn Press, London (reprinted 1982).
- Post Liminium. Essays and Critical Papers (1911) edited by Thomas Whittemore, Elkin Mathews, London (reprinted 1968).
- Lionel Johnson: Victorian Dark Angel by Richard Whittington-Egan, Cappella Archive (2012).
- At the Heart of the 1890s: Essays on Lionel Johnson Gary Paterson, AMS Press (2008)
- Incurable: The Haunted Writings of Lionel Johnson, the Decadent Era’s Dark Angel edited by Nina Antonia, Strange Attractor Press (2018)
- Lionel Johnson: Poetry and Prose edited by Robert Asch, Saint Austin Press (2021)
