= Chavagnes =

- Part of Terranjou
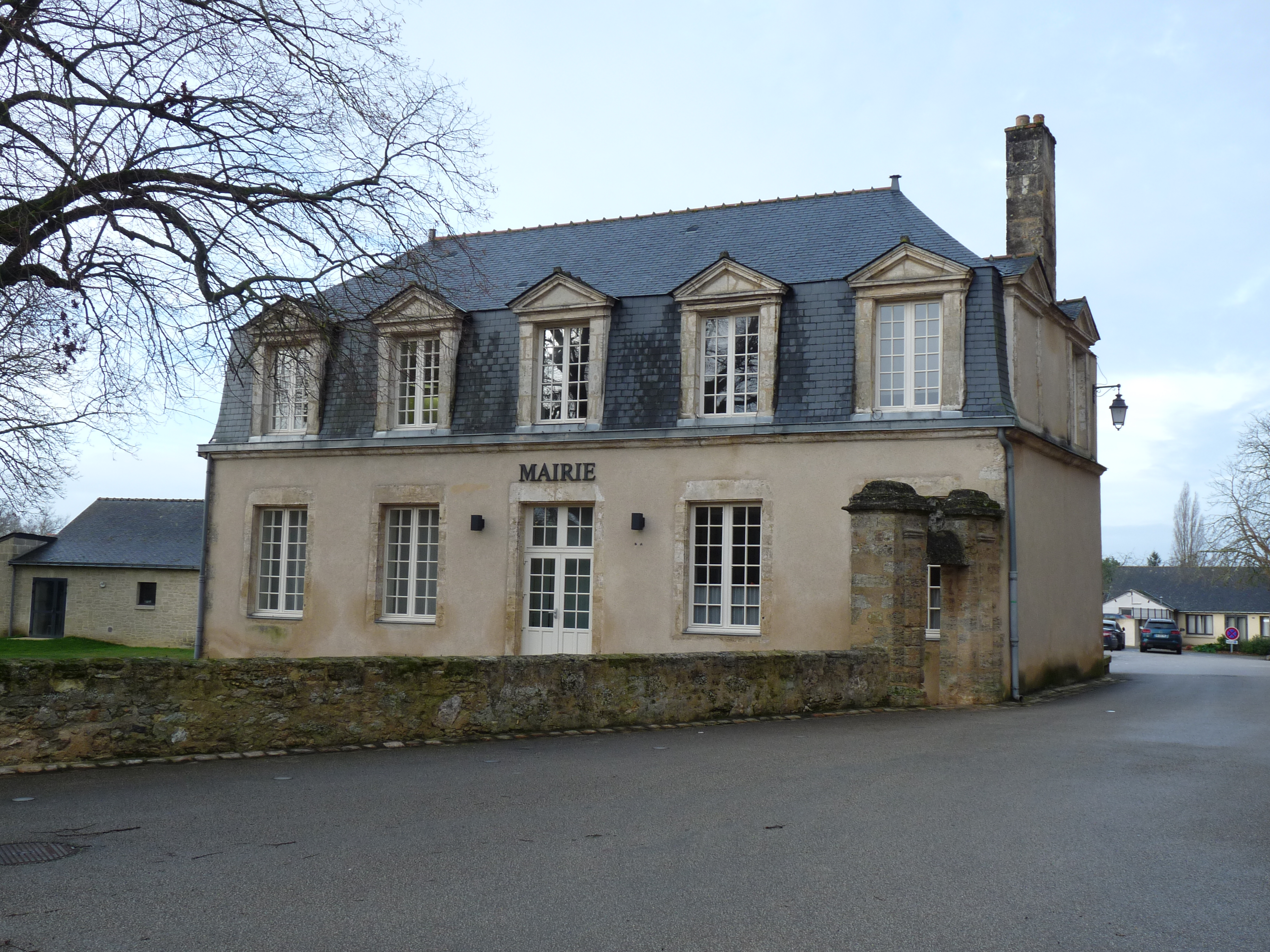
- Chavagnes Town hall
- Location of Chavagnes
- Location within France Location within Pays de la Loire
- Coordinates: 47°16′13″N 0°27′13″W
- Country: France
- Region: Pays de la Loire
- Department: Maine-et-Loire
- Arrondissement: Angers
- Canton: Chemillé-Melay
- Commune: Terranjou
- Area^{1}: 16.21 km^{2} (6.26 sq mi)
- Elevation: 84 m (276 ft)
- Highest elevation: 98 m (322 ft)
- Lowest elevation: 41 m (135 ft)
- Population (2022): 1,264
  - Density: 77.98/km^{2} (202.0/sq mi)
- Demonym(s): Chavagnais, Chavagnaise
- Time zone: UTC+01:00 (CET)
  - Summer (DST): UTC+02:00 (CEST)
- Postal code: 49380
- ^{1} French Land Register data, which excludes lakes, ponds, glaciers > 1 km^{2} (0.386 sq mi or 247 acres) and river estuaries.

Chavagnes (French pronunciation: [ʃavaɲ]; also called Chavagnes-les-Eaux) is a former commune in the Maine-et-Loire department of western France. On 1 January 2017, it was merged into the new Terranjou commune.

== See also ==
- Communes of the Maine-et-Loire department
- Chavagnes-en-Paillers, Vendée department
- Chavagnes-les-Redoux, Vendée department
- Chavagnes International College situated in Chavagnes-en-Paillers.
