= André Rogerie =

General André Rogerie
- Born: 25 December 1921; Villefagnan, France
- Died: 1 May 2014 (aged 92); Martigné-Briand, France
- Education: Saint-Cyr
- Occupation: Soldier
- Years active: 1942–
- Known for: witness to the Holocaust
- Notable work: Vivre c'est vaincre
- Title: General
- Awards: Commander of the Legion of Honour

André Rogerie (25 December 1921 – May 2014) was a member of the French Resistance in World War II and survivor of seven Nazi concentration camps who testified after the war about what he had seen in the camps.

Rogerie was born in Villefagnan in the Charente department of south-western France. His trajectory was "typical of the complexity of the movement of deportees among the camps." His eyewitness account of Auschwitz-Birkenau exemplifies the self-published eyewitness accounts published in the immediate aftermath of the war, but ignored until the 1980s. He is also notable for having produced the oldest contemporary sketch of a camp crematorium, also ignored by historians for decades until the 1987 publication of Le Monde juif by Georges Wellers.

== Early years and entry into the French Resistance ==
André Rogerie was born to Joseph and Jeanne Rogerie in Villefagnan, in the department of Charente in western France on 25 December 1921, the fifth child in a Catholic military family. His father was an officer who died in 1923 from wounds he received in World War I.

He was raised with a traditional love of country and God. His older brother, also an officer, was killed in 1940. The German invasion in May 1940 and defeat of France was deeply distressing to him; when he learned that Marshal Philippe Pétain requested an armistice from the Germans in June, he collapsed. A few days later, a friend informed him that a young General De Gaulle was continuing the war in England, and Rogerie resolved to join him.

In 1941, he joined the lycée St. Louis in preparation for entering the French military academy at St. Cyr. He joined up with the Ceux de la Libération (CDLL) movement, which was chiefly involved in the manufacture of false papers and which his cousin had joined, but as a young intern, he had limited involvement.

His goal was above all else to get to England and join the fight. He was not aware of anti-Jewish discrimination until he saw Jews obliged to wear the yellow star in June 1942. As a mark of solidarity, he and a colleague went around Angouleme for a few days wearing a blue star. He walked around in public throwing anti-German pamphlets he crudely printed himself. After the Allied landings in North Africa in November 1942, he sought to join the Free French Forces led by Charles de Gaulle via Spain and the southern Mediterranean Sea.

Through a colleague, he found a source and obtained some counterfeit identity papers, but they were of poor quality, and on 3 July 1943, at age 21, he was arrested by the Gestapo in Dax, along with two other friends. He was imprisoned, and held by the Gestapo in Biarritz, Bayonne, Bordeaux and Compiègne before being deported to the camps.

== Deportation ==
Rogerie was deported to Buchenwald at the end of October 1943, and spent time in a succession of camps, including Buchenwald, Dora, Majdanek and Auschwitz-Birkenau. During the death march he also passed through the camps of Gross-Rosen, Nordhausen, Dora again, and Harzungen. He ended up escaping from the column on 12 April 1945 near Magdebourg, and reentered France alone on 15 May.

On arrival in Buchenwald on 1 November 1943, his head was shaved, he was disinfected and sent to the barracks in rags. His initial assignment was carrying stones. From Buchenwald he was sent on to Dora where conditions were appalling. The deportees had to work tirelessly in the cold, starving, sick, without water or sleep. In three months he was a wreck and was no longer able to work.

Having become "useless" Rogerie was sent in a convoy of ill prisoners to Lublin. In her book Deportation and Genocide. Between Memory and Oblivion published in 1992, Annette Wieviorka asks if Rogerie meant the Majdanek camp in the outskirts of Lublin. In fact, his report published in 1945 is not clear on this point; he speaks only briefly about the camp.

In the 1987 Jewish World Rogerie no longer speaks about the camp of Lublin but of Majdanek. Two more months passed waiting for death. When the Soviet Army approached Lublin, the camp was evacuated. On 18 April 1944, Rogerie arrived at Auschwitz-Birkenau. The name "Auschwitz" meant nothing to him. He was tattooed and transferred to the quarantine camp of Birkenau. Right away, a French doctor told him that they were gassing people to death. He didn't believe it. That evening, he learned that three hundred young Jewish women were gassed. It was at that moment that he learned about the extermination of the Jews. He made a promise to himself to bear witness if he were to get out alive.

== After the liberation ==
On 13 April 1945, the Americans liberated the sector. Rogerie remained one month in a German school, regaining 18 kg (40 lb). He began writing his memoir in a school notebook. After a month, he was evacuated to France by truck, arriving in Angouleme on 17 May 1945. He continued writing, with his sister helping with the typing, and completed his manuscript on 21 October. He self-published it in 1945 under the title "You Win By Living" (Vivre c'est vaincre) with a print run of 1,000 copies using monies he received as back salary.

He illustrated his book with a map of Birkenau and a sketch of a crematorium both drawn from memory. This graphic was credited by Georges Wellers as being the oldest of its kind and highly accurate. The fact of having drawn it immediately after liberation became a source of relief to Rogerie, because what he lived through later seemed so incredible, that he sometimes wondered if it was possible. He believed that what he lived through was so beyond normal experience that words fail. "The deportees try to recount it—actual historical facts, but unimaginable—but how to convey the cold, the hunger, the beatings, the suffering, the cries, the howling, the shrieks, the fear, the fatigue, the filth, the stink, the promiscuity, the endlessness, the poverty, the disease, the torture, the horror, the hangings, the gas chambers, the deaths?"

Rogerie matriculated as an officer candidate in Saint-Cyr, the French West Point or Sandhurst, in 1946. He chose a specialty in engineering and was posted to Germany before going on to French Indochina. He ended his career with the rank of Général and was decorated as a Commander of the Legion of Honour. He died in May 2014 in Martigné-Briand.

== Struggle against Holocaust denial ==
After the publication in 1945 of his book Vivre c'est vaincre, he didn't speak publicly about deportation and the Jewish genocide. He knew nothing about the existence of the Center of Contemporary Jewish Documentation nor were they in possession of his book. The rise of Holocaust denial led him to speak out once again. In 1986 he published an article in Le Déporté, the organ of the Union Nationale des Associations de Déportés, Internés et Familles de disparus and then in Le Monde juif (edition of Jan/Mar 1987).

He wrote about the fate of Jews and Gypsies at Auschwitz. He knew that, as a Catholic, no one could accuse him of embellishing the facts. Even so, he was often attacked by Holocaust deniers, whom he, in turn, viewed as obvious anti-Semites. He drew a clear distinction between deportation and persecution (of Jews and Gypsies) on the one hand, and that of repression (of Resistance members) on the other. He gave testimony about life in concentration camps in speeches to academic establishments, and on CD and on DVD. In 1994 he received the "Mémoire de la Shoah" prize of the Buchmann Foundation. On 16 January 2005, he testified about his experiences along with Simone Veil at the Paris city hall, on the occasion of the commemoration of the liberation of Auschwitz.

== Works ==
- Vivre c'est vaincre (the English title is You Win By Living: literally the French title translates as "To live is to conquer [vanquish]")
  - First ed., self-published, Paris, 1946.
  - — (1988), Vivre c'est vaincre [You Win By Living] (in French), Paris: André-Hubert Hérault, p. 106, ISBN 2-903851-50-6, OCLC 462001287
  - Reissued by the author, Paris, 1994.
- Preface, Suzanne Birnbaum, Une Française juive est revenue: Auschwitz, Belsen, Raguhn (A Jewish Frenchwoman Returns: Auschwitz, Belsen, Raguhn), Hérault, 1989, 146pp.
- La République panurgienne (The Panurgian Republic), 1991, 53pp. FRBnF: 354681544. La République panurgienne at Google Books
- 1943–1945 Déporté: Témoin des crimes nazis contre l'humanité (Deported: Eyewitness to Nazi Crimes Against Humanity), Mouans Sartoux: PEMF, 1994: book based on his 1945 story Vivre c'est vaincre and on a series of interviews carried out in 1991 with primary and secondary school students in the city of Angers.
- Auschwitz-Birkenau. Leçons de ténèbres (Auschwitz-Birkenau. Lessons from the Gloom), Plon, 1995.
- Calembredaines et billevesées (Claptrap and Balderdash), 1995 ISBN 2-9509134-0-7; FRBnF: 35827440w.

== Sources ==
- Wellers, Georges [in French] (1987), "André Rogerie, Un témoignage hors pair : les chambres à gaz au camp d'Auschwitz-Birkenau" [André Rogerie, An Unparalleled Testimony: the Gas Chambers of Auschwitz-Birkenau], Le Monde juif (in French) (125), Paris: CDJC: 3–16
- Wieviorka, Annette [in French] (1992), Déportation et génocide. Entre la mémoire et l'oubli [Deportation and Genocide. Between Memory and Oblivion] (in French), Paris: Plon, pp. 249–252

== See also ==
- Criticism of Holocaust denial
- Filip Müller
- French Resistance
