= St. Austin Review =

Religious academic journal

- Discipline: Culture
- Language: English
- Edited by: Joseph Pearce and Robert Asch

Publication details
- History: 2001
- Publisher: St. Augustine's Press (United States)
- Frequency: Bimonthly

Standard abbreviations
- ISO 4: St Austin Rev.

Indexing
- ISSN: 2334-5934

Links
- Journal homepage

The St. Austin Review (StAR) is a Catholic international review of culture and ideas. It is edited by author, columnist and EWTN TV host Joseph Pearce and literary scholar Robert Asch. StAR includes book reviews, discussions on Christian art, contemporary Christian poetry, and erudite essays on all aspects of both past and present literature and culture from a traditionalist Catholic perspective. The magazine is based in South Bend, Indiana.

Originally launched to be the flagship publication of the Saint Austin Press in 2001, it is now published by St. Augustine's Press. It is distributed by St. Augustine's in North America, and was distributed in Europe by Family Publications until they ceased trading. The journal is multinational in content, containing material from North America, Europe, and Australasia, although the review tends to lean toward material from the United States.

In addition to the editors, regular contributors have included G. K. Chesterton scholar Dale Ahlquist, Ordinariate priest and Catholic apologist Fr. Dwight Longenecker, former C. S. Lewis protégé Fr. Peter Milward, Fr. James V. Schall, musicologist Susan Treacy, Chavagnes International College founder Ferdi McDermott, editor-in-chief of Baronius Press Dr. John Newton, Dr. Patrick Riley, and artist and essayist Jef Murray.

Poets and writers whose work has appeared in StAR include Dana Gioia, Maryann Corbett, Ralph McInerny, Pope Emeritus Benedict XVI, Aidan Nichols, Fr. Benedict Groeschel, Alice von Hildebrand, scholar of Scottish Gaelic literature Ronald Black, Brendan D. King, and Peter Kreeft. Frequently, theme issues of StAR focus on the role played by Catholicism in the arts, the literature, the history, and the culture of Great Britain, the United States, and many other nations. Occasionally, StAR has also introduced its readers to literary figures of the past who were not previously well known among Conservative and Traditionalist Catholics.

For example, Jackson T. Hern alleged in a 2022-StAR article that the 10th-century German nun Hrotsvitha of Gandersheim Abbey, a Medieval Latin playwright better known among Radical feminists, successfully Christianized the theatre of Ancient Rome.

There has also been, however, almost as much focus upon the writings and literary legacy of non-Catholic poets and writers, such as Vladimir Soloviev, Fyodor Dostoevsky, C. S. Lewis, John Milton, John Donne, Richard Wilbur, Jane Austen, Alexander Solzhenitsyn, and T. S. Eliot.

In a 2022 interview with StAR co-editor Joseph Pearce, Polish journalist Anna Szyda from the literary magazine Magna Polonia explained that the nihilism of modern American poetry is widely noticed and commented upon in the Third Polish Republic as reflecting, "the deleterious influence of the contemporary civilisation on the American soul." In response, StAR co-editor Joseph Pearce described "the neo-formalist revival" inspired by the late Richard Wilbur and how it has been reflected in recent verse by the Catholic poets whom he and Robert Asch publish in StAR. Pearce said that the Catholic faith and optimism of the younger generation of Catholic poets made him feel hope for the future.
