= David Sweetman =

British writer (1943-2002)

- Born: 18 March 1943; Dilston, Northumberland
- Died: 8 April 2002 (aged 59); London, England
- Occupations: Writer; critic; teacher; broadcaster

David Sweetman (16 March 1943 – 7 April 2002) was a British writer, critic, teacher and broadcaster.

== Early life ==
Born David Robert Sweetman in 1943, he left Dilston in 1960 to study Fine Art at King's College, Newcastle (University of Durham), as a scholarship student. At King's he formed what would become a lifelong friendship with Bryan Ferry, an artist and performer. After graduation, he went to Africa to teach English. He took a diploma at Makerere College in Uganda and wrote a series of textbooks on teaching English for the British Council in Tunisia, as well as a series of adventure books (Skyjack over Africa and other titles) and biographies (Queen Nzinga: The Woman Who Saved Her People, among other titles in his series called Makers of African History) published by Longmans for younger African readers to encourage their language skills. Toward the end of the decade, he taught English and art at a school in Dar es Salaam.

== Writer and poet ==
Sweetman was a frequent and prolific book reviewer and a poet of some distinction. His poems were published in a number of periodicals including The Listener, the Times Literary Supplement, the New Statesman and Quarto. In 1981, Faber published a collection, Looking into the Deep End, which became a Poetry Book Society Choice.

His important survey Women Leaders in African History was published in 1984. In 1986, Zeffirelli, a biography of Italian film director Franco Zeffirelli was published. He then turned to writing artist biographies. His 1990 Vincent van Gogh biography, The Love of Many Things (also published as Van Gogh: His Life and His Art) became an award-winning book. This was quickly followed by biographies of Mary Renault (1994), Paul Gauguin (1995), and Explosive Acts: Toulouse-Lautrec, Oscar Wilde, Félix Fénéon, and the Art & Anarchy of the Fin de Siecle (1999). He had a novel, A Tribal Fever, published in 1996.

A generous man with an acerbic wit, his London home was often filled with African refugees. He also wrote a series of cookbooks and created restaurants with his longtime companion, Thai chef Vatcharin Bhumitchitr.

== Broadcaster ==
In 1971, Sweetman, who had been associated briefly with the BBC World Service, became presenter of "Poetry Workshop," one of BBC Radio London's first literary programmes. Sweetman co-produced the weekly programme with Denis Boyles, an American poet and journalist, for Wanda's Factory, a London "underground" literary cooperative. He interviewed a number of important literary figures for the programme, including Stephen Spender and Lawrence Durrell.

He subsequently became a television documentary director and producer, collaborating with Roderick Gradidge for a series on architecture, with Stephen Bayley for a series on design, and with Anton Dolin and Wayne Sleep for a series on the ballet. Sweetman's documentary reports were also broadcast on Omnibus.

Sweetman was diagnosed in early 2000 with multiple system atrophy and died in London two years later.
