= Wanda's Factory =

Former London literary co-operative

Wanda's Factory was a co-operative of London poets and literary magazine editors active in the early 1970s. The co-operative sponsored readings and musical performances at venues throughout London, including at the Institute of Contemporary Arts, St. Mary's Paddington Green and at London's Canaletto Gallery, featuring writers such as Eddie Linden, Giles Gordon, John Heath-Stubbs and Americans Marilyn Hacker, Robert Coover and Ann Lauterbach.

Wanda's Factory was also responsible for producing Poetry Workshop, one of the first literary programmes broadcast on BBC Radio London. The programme was presented by David Sweetman and was broadcast from 1971 until 1972.

Founded in London in 1970 by poet Denis Boyles, the co-operative was dissolved in 1973.
