= Louis-Marie Baudouin =

French Roman Catholic priest

Venerable Louis-Marie Baudouin
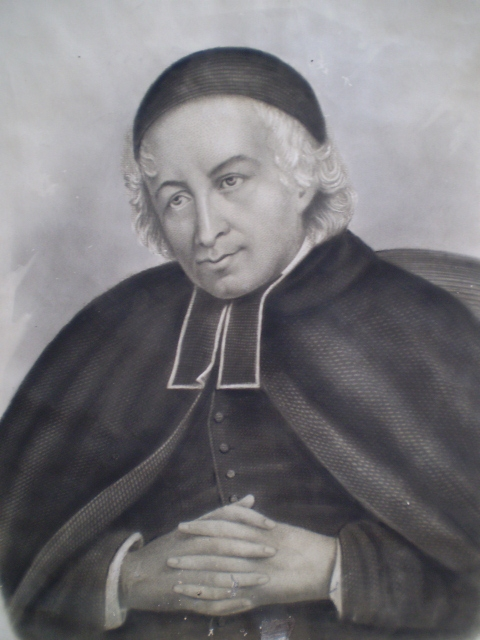
- Venerable Louis-Marie Baudouin.
- Born: 2 August 1765; Montaigu, Vendée, Kingdom of France
- Died: 12 February 1835 (aged 69); Chavagnes-en-Paillers, Kingdom of France

Louis-Marie Baudouin (2 August 1765 - 12 February 1835) was a French Roman Catholic priest who was the founder of the Sons of Mary Immaculate and the Ursulines of Jesus. Pope Benedict XVI proclaimed him as venerable on 20 December 2012.

== Life ==
Louis-Marie Baudouin was born in Montaigu, Vendée on 2 August 1765, the last of eight children. His father, a gardener at the Château de Montaigu, died when Louis-Marie was about two years old. As a boy, he became a chorister in the collegiate church of St. Maurice. The canons undertook the expense of his education with a teacher in the town. When his mother died in 1780, he was looked after by his eldest sister Marie. He then went to live with his eldest brother, Pierre Martin, curate of Chantonnay. When Pierre Martin was made Curé of Angles in 1782, his younger brother accompanied him. That October Louis-Marie entered the Seminary of Luçon.

He was ordained as a Catholic priest at Saint-Malo on 19 September 1789. He was assigned as curate to his brother, now Curé of Luçon. Besides preaching, he tended the sick at the hospital.

== Exile ==
In 1790 Baudouin refused to swear to the Civil Constitution of the Clergy of the new French government during the French Revolution. He became a hunted and proscribed priest who heard confessions and celebrated Mass in an underground cellar. After arrest and seven months imprisonment, he was released and went into exile to Spain on 9 September 1792 along with 234 other priests. He spent most of it in Toledo, where Archbishop Francisco Antonio de Lorenzana sheltered over 400 French priests. While there, his brother's health failed and Pierre Martin Baudouin died in Toledo at the age of forty-seven.

While in Spain, Louis-Marie became a skilled lace maker, should he need to obtain a workman's passport to return to France. In August 1797, he and his colleague Father Lebédesque made their way to Bordeaux, where friends brought them to Libourne. From there they sailed to Les Sables-d'Olonne hidden aboard in a cask. They lived in hiding, sometimes going abroad disguised as sailors.

In 1799 Napoleon Bonaparte allowed free exercise of worship following the end of the wars of the Vendée. He was appointed to the parish of la Jonchère on 31 July 1801 at Chavagnes-en-Paillers. In 1803 a seminary was established in Chavagnes - now a part of Chavagnes International College.

Baudouin would visit the sick in the night dressed in disguise. He was a driving force for Marian devotion and constant reception of the sacraments.

In 1805 he undertook the beginning of a small society of the children of Mary. This became the twin congregations of the Sons of Mary Immaculate and the Ursulines of Jesus.

In 1812 the seminary of Chavagnes was transferred, on the orders of Napoleon, to La Rochelle. Baudouin moved to La Rochelle where he was appointed as the superior of the seminary and as the vicar general of the diocese.

In 1821 the diocese of Luçon was restored and Chavagnes once again became the major seminary; Baudouin was re-appointed as its rector as well as being vicar general of the diocese.

Baudouin - in 1829 - retired to Chavagnes-en-Paillers. He died there at the age of 69.

== Beatification cause ==
The cause of beatification commenced in France and spanned from 1864-5 which also bestowed upon him the title of Servant of God. Despite the fact that the cause commenced at this stage the formal introduction of the cause was on 7 September 1871 under Pope Pius IX. It continued on a local level and the two processes were ratified on 26 August 1911.

The Positio - the documentation on his life of heroic virtue - was sent to the Congregation for the Causes of Saints in 1996 for further evaluation. Pope Benedict XVI recognized his heroic virtue on 20 December 2012 and declared him to be Venerable.

A miracle alleged to have been of his intercession was also investigated and the process that investigated the miracle was validated on 2 April 2009. The medical board that works for the Congregation for the Causes of Saints approved the miracle on 21 March 2013.
