= Denis Boyles =

American writer and academic

Denis Boyles was a journalist, editor, university lecturer and the author/editor of several books of poetry, travel/history, criticism, humor, practical advice and essays. His work has appeared in many American and European magazines and newspapers. He died in 2023.

== Education ==
His MA was awarded by the graduate Writing Seminars at the Johns Hopkins University; his PhD is from the Communications and Media Research Institute (CAMRI) of the University of Westminster in London.

== Career ==
As an editor, he edited an "underground" newspaper in Baltimore in the '60s. He taught in Baltimore, London and Dublin, then served on the editorial staff of Crawdaddy, The New York Times Magazine, National Lampoon, Playboy, and Men's Health, where he was a popular columnist and a National Magazine Award finalist. He served as editorial director for several digital publishers, including Novo Media and Third Age Media, and from 2010 to 2013 was a juror for the University of Missouri Journalism School-administered City and Regional Magazine Association competition. For several years he wrote commentary on the European press in a column for National Review Online, and was a contributor to the 2009 Oxford Encyclopedia of Human Rights.

He resided in France, where he taught at The Brouzils Seminars, a graduate and undergraduate writing and creative arts program. In 2009, with philosopher Anthony O'Hear OBE, he launched The Fortnightly Review's "New Series", of which he is currently co-editor (with Prof. Alan Macfarlane), and editor of its book imprint, Odd Volumes.

From 2012 to 2015, he was a visiting fellow in the School of Humanities at the University of Buckingham. In 2015, he joined the faculties of the Chavagnes Studium, where he teaches literature courses and tutors senior students in literature and philosophy, and l’Institut Catholique d’Études Supérieures in La Roche sur Yon (I.C.E.S., the University of the Vendée), where he taught graduate courses in journalism. He was a teacher at Chavagne International College, a Catholic boarding school in France.

== Books ==
Boyles is the author of numerous books, including Design Poetics (1975), The Modern Man's Guide to Life (1986), African Lives (1989), Man Eaters Motel (1991), A Man's Life: The Complete Instructions (1996), The Pocket Professor series (2001) and Vile France (2005), a satirical examination of French elites.

In 2008, he wrote Superior, Nebraska, a book about Midwestern political and social values (Doubleday) and in 2009, he co-wrote a documentary film, Femmes de Soldats, with French journalist Alain Hertoghe for Kuiv Productions Paris. In 2016 Boyles completed a history of the creation and compilation of the Encyclopædia Britannica's 11th edition (1910) for Knopf that was called "weighty, but worthwhile" by a reviewer for the Seattle Times.

Boyle died on 6 November 2023.

== Bibliography ==
- Design Poetics (1975)
- The Modern Man's Guide to Life (1986)
- African Lives (1989)
- Man Eaters Motel and Other Stops on the Railway to Nowhere (1991)
- The Modern Man's Guide to Modern Women (1993)
- A Man's Life: The Complete Instructions (1996)
- The Lost Lore of a Man's Life (1997)
- The Pocket Professor's guides (religion, physics, philosophy, economics) (as series editor) (2001)
- Vile France (2005)
- Superior, Nebraska: The Common-Sense Values of America's Heartland (2008); Revised and republished as The Republican River: Democracy in Middle America (2018) ISBN 9781732900905
- Everything Explained That Is Explainable: On the Creation of the Encyclopædia Britannica's Celebrated Eleventh Edition (2016), ISBN 0307269175
