= Chavagnes Studium =

Coordinates: 46.8939°N 1.2516°W

The Chavagnes Studium, part of Chavagnes International College
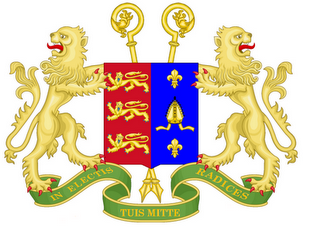
- Arms of Chavagnes International College
- Motto: In electis tuis mitte radices
- Motto in English: "Put down roots in your elect"
- Type: Private
- Established: 2002
- Affiliation: Catholic
- Principal: Ferdi McDermott
- Location: Chavagnes-en-Paillers, France
- Website: chavagnes.org/studium/

The Chavagnes Studium is an English-speaking international centre for the study of the Liberal Arts, founded in 2002 as part of Chavagnes International College, an educational institution in the Vendée in the west of France. The Studium supports the postgraduate work of the Fellows of the college, is involved in adult education and also organises seminars and conferences open to the public. From September 2018 the Studium offers, in conjunction with the Institut catholique d'études supérieures, a local Catholic university, a UK-validated Bachelor of Arts degree in the Liberal Arts with French, based on the model followed by Liberal Arts Colleges in the United States.

== History ==
Chavagnes International College, and the Studium, occupy a building which was the first junior seminary in France after the Revolution. The pursuit of religious and academic work goes back further, however, as there was a Benedictine foundation on the site from the 13th century.

=== Founding ===
Chavagnes was refounded as an International College in 2002, by a group of British teachers, but the plan to offer a degree level formation grew out of the experience of the Great Books Weeks, begun in Chavagnes in 2009 by Professor Anthony O'Hear of the Royal Institute of Philosophy. The Great Books Weeks are week-long meetings devoted to the study of literature and history held at Chavagnes during the summer. These continue as the Chavagnes Studium Summer conference.

== Academics ==
The new degree course is based on the intensive 2-year model perfected by the University of Buckingham in the UK. The content of the degree is particularly wide, but is the rough equivalent of a degree in comparative literature. Subjects studied include Literature, Mathematics, Science, History, Philosophy and Theology, French and optional Latin.

Chavagnes Studium is assisted by an International Advisory Board which includes senior ecclesiastical and academic figures from around the world.

The teaching, assessment and validation of Chavagnes degree programmes are carried out in partnership with ICES and St Mary's University, Twickenham.

== Other activities ==
- Postgraduate study and research of Fellows of the college
- Publication of a termly review, Eloquentia
- Organisation of conferences.
