= Robert Asch =

British Catholic writer and scholar

- Education: St Paul's School; University of Toronto
- Occupations: Author, scholar
- Spouse: Ruth Tyldesley Asch

Robert Charles Asch (born 1968) is an English Catholic writer, literary critic, and scholar.

== Early life ==
Robert Asch was born in London in 1968, into a family of mixed Canadian- and Austrian Jewish descent. His parents were both opera singers. He was educated at St Paul's School and the University of Toronto.

== Career ==
Along with Joseph Pearce, Asch has been co-editor of the St. Austin Review, a Catholic cultural and literary magazine, since September 2001. He is also the Editor of Saint Austin Press.

Asch was Senior Master and teacher of English and History at Chavagnes International College, France, from its inception in 2002 till 2012. He was recently awarded a Wilbur Research Fellowship at the Russell Kirk Center for Cultural Renewal for his work towards a new study of the English poet Lionel Johnson.

In July 2022, Asch appeared as a speaker at the 41st Annual Conference of the American Chesterton Society in Milwaukee, Wisconsin. Asch's lecture was titled "Chesterton and the Jews".

== Personal life ==
Asch is married to the poet Ruth Tyldesley Asch. After several years of living in the post-Velvet Revolution Czech Republic, Asch converted from Reform Judaism to Roman Catholicism, which he has called, "a completion" instead of a rejection of the Jewish religion, in 1996. Asch currently resides with his wife and children at Preston, Lancashire.

== Works ==
- Asch, Robert; Pearce, Joseph, eds. (2014). The Romantic Poets: Blake, Wordsworth, and Coleridge, With an Introduction and Contemporary Criticism. San Francisco, California: Ignatius Press. ISBN 9781586172640. OCLC 912700428.
- Asch, Robert, ed. Lionel Johnson: Poetry and Prose. Saint Austin Press, 2021. ISBN 978-1919673004.
