= The Quest for Shakespeare =

2009 television documentary series

The Quest for Shakespeare is a television documentary series shown on cable channel EWTN. It is written and presented by author Joseph Pearce about William Shakespeare, and specifically the evidence that his religion was Catholic. The series comprises thirteen episodes that began airing May 2009. The shows feature dramatizations of pertinent scenes and excerpts from Shakespeare's work by actors from Theatre of the Word, a theatrical company founded by Father Joseph Fessio.

== Episodes ==
Episode	Title	Description
1	"Will the Real Shakespeare Please Stand Up?"	Looking into evidence that Shakespeare was Catholic.
2	"His Father's Will"	The last will and testament of John Shakespeare, William Shakespeare's father, modelled on a spiritual testament of Charles Borromeo, showing that the writer came from a devout Catholic family.
3	"Faith of his Fathers"	More on Shakespeare's family.
4	"Living with Outlaws"	Persecution of the Catholic faith as Shakespeare grew up.
5	"A Rose by Any Other Name"	Whether Shakespeare served as a teacher in the estate of the Catholic Houghton family.
6	"Love’s Labours, Lost Years"	The writer's "lost years", marriage and the baptism of his children as possible evidence of his faith.
7	"Murdered Spy, Martyred Priest"	Connections to Christopher Marlowe and Saint Robert Southwell.
8	"Playing Safe with the Queen"	Shakespeare's complicated dealings with Queen Elizabeth I.
9	"Family, Friends and Enemies"	Potential proof of Catholicism in the writer's relations with Family, Friends and Enemies.
10	"The King's Good Servant"	Difficulties of relating with King James I. How could he remain the King's while remaining faithful to his Church.
11	"The Lessons of Lear"	Evidence of Catholic sympathies in the work, King Lear.
12	"Last Years"	End of his career, return to Stratford, and the Catholic milieu.
13	"'He Died a Papist'"	Shakespeare's will as evidence that his life and passing were as a faithful member of the Church.

== See also ==
- William Shakespeare's religion
