= Terranjou =

- Commune
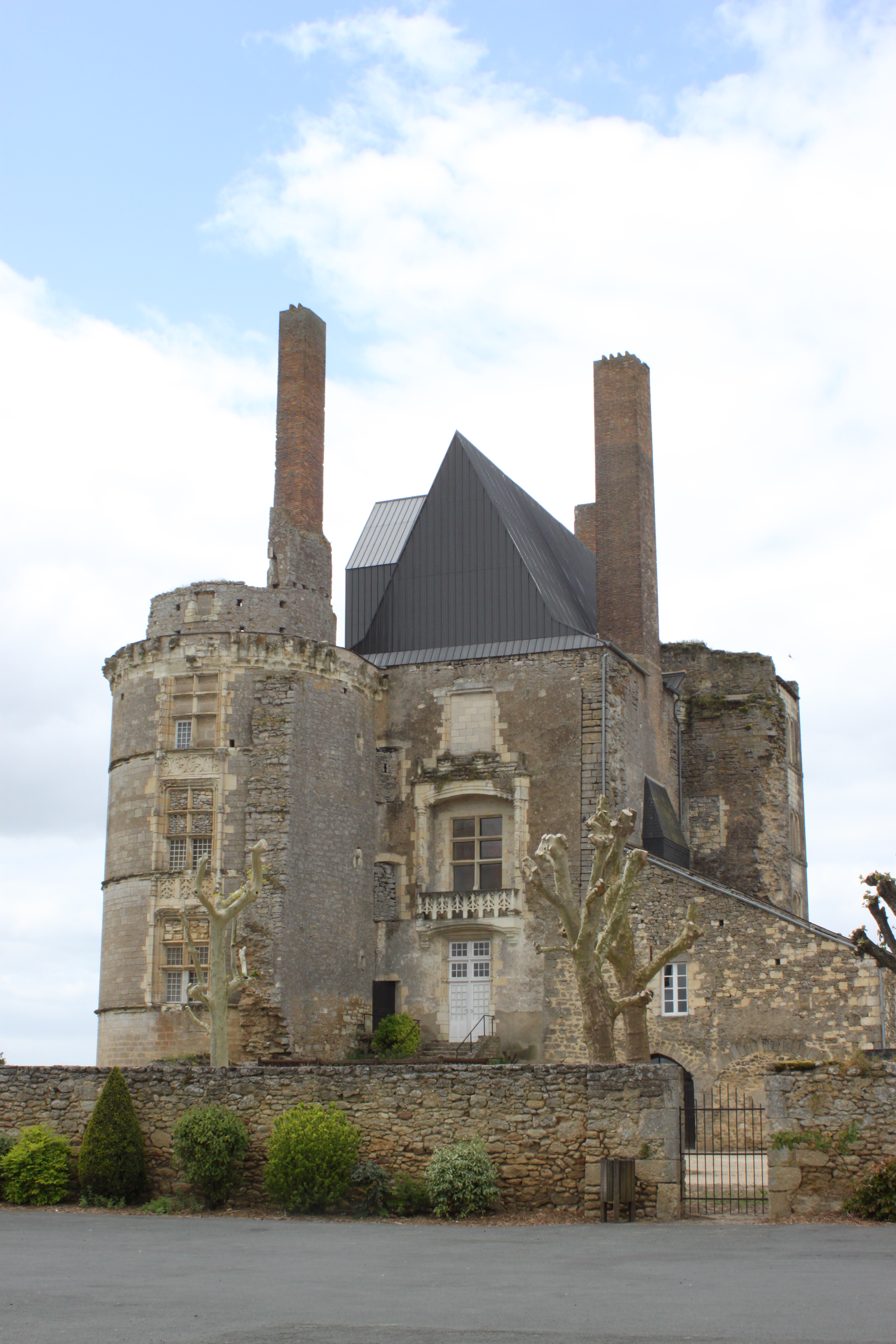
- The château of Martigné-Briand
- Location of Terranjou
- Location within France Location within Pays de la Loire
- Coordinates: 47°16′12″N 0°27′14″W
- Country: France
- Region: Pays de la Loire
- Department: Maine-et-Loire
- Arrondissement: Angers
- Canton: Chemillé-en-Anjou
- Intercommunality: Loire Layon Aubance

Government
  - Mayor (2020–2026): Jean-Pierre Cochard
- Area^{1}: 57.05 km^{2} (22.03 sq mi)
- Population (2023): 3,871
  - Density: 67.85/km^{2} (175.7/sq mi)
- Time zone: UTC+01:00 (CET)
  - Summer (DST): UTC+02:00 (CEST)
- INSEE/Postal code: 49086 /49540, 49380
- ^{1} French Land Register data, which excludes lakes, ponds, glaciers > 1 km^{2} (0.386 sq mi or 247 acres) and river estuaries.

Terranjou (French pronunciation: [tɛʁɑ̃ʒu]) is a commune in the department of Maine-et-Loire, western France. The municipality was established on 1 January 2017 by merger of the former communes of Chavagnes (the seat), Martigné-Briand and Notre-Dame-d'Allençon.

== Population ==
Population data refer to the area corresponding with the commune as of January 2025.

Historical population
Year	Pop.	±% p.a.
1968	2,701	—
1975	2,743	+0.22%
1982	2,776	+0.17%
1990	2,766	−0.05%
1999	2,900	+0.53%
2007	3,278	+1.54%
2012	3,686	+2.37%
2017	3,967	+1.48%
2023	3,871	−0.41%
Source: INSEE

== See also ==
- Communes of the Maine-et-Loire department
