= Tolkien: Man and Myth =

1998 book about J. R. R. Tolkien by Joseph Pearce

- Author: Joseph Pearce
- Publisher: HarperCollins
- Publication date: 1998
- Pages: 320
- ISBN: 978-0002740180

Tolkien: Man and Myth is a 1998 book by Joseph Pearce about J. R. R. Tolkien, published by HarperCollins. It has been credited with being particularly important in the context of discourse about Tolkien's Catholicism.

== Contents ==
Chapter 1, A misunderstood man: Tolkien and the modern world, opens with the 1997 Waterstones/Channel 4 poll (which declared Tolkien's The Lord of the Rings to be the "greatest book of the century") and the ensuing critical backlash (Howard Jacobson, Germaine Greer, etc.). Pearce contrasts this with popular acclaim and defenses (Paul Goodman, Patrick Curry, Jeffrey Richards, Anne Atkins), framing Tolkien as "misunderstood" due to his traditional/Catholic worldview opposing modernity's secularism, relativism, and "flight from reality" accusations. Discussing Tolkien's place within the cultural and ideological currents of the twentieth century, Pearce argues that Tolkien has frequently been mischaracterized by modern critics who overlook the deeply traditional and Catholic foundations of his worldview and frames him as a writer fundamentally at odds with modernity's secularism and moral relativism, and his works as a response to the spiritual and cultural crises of his age.

In Chapter 2, Cradle convert to the grave: The child behind the myth, Pearce examines Tolkien's childhood, focusing on his early family life (South African birth, return to England, rural idyll in Sarehole – seeds of the Shire), his mother Mabel's conversion to Catholicism, and the formative trauma of her early death. The chapter emphasizes the decisive role of Catholic faith in shaping Tolkien's imagination and moral outlook. Pearce presents Tolkien's early experiences of loss, displacement, and faith as foundational influences on both his personality and literary myth-making.

Chapter 3, Father Francis to Father Christmas: The father behind the myth, explores Tolkien's guardianship under Father Francis Morgan and the role of paternal influence in his development. Pearce connects Tolkien's sense of authority, discipline, and moral structure to these formative relationships. The chapter also discusses Tolkien's later life as husband and father, including the famous Father Christmas letters, portraying Tolkien's domestic life as an extension of his creative imagination.

In Chapter 4, True myth: Tolkien and the conversion of C.S. Lewis, Pearce recounts Tolkien's intellectual and spiritual influence on C. S. Lewis, focusing on their conversations (in 1931) about myth and Christianity. The chapter argues that Tolkien's articulation of the concept of "true myth" was instrumental in Lewis's conversion from atheism to Christianity. Pearce presents Tolkien's understanding of myth as a theological and artistic framework central to his own creative work.

Chapter 5, A ring of fellowship: Tolkien, Lewis and the Inklings, examines Tolkien's participation in the Inklings literary circle. Pearce describes the collaborative and critical environment that shaped the development of The Lord of the Rings and other works. While acknowledging tensions—particularly between Tolkien and Lewis—the chapter emphasizes the mutual intellectual stimulation and shared Christian imagination that defined the group.

In Chapter 6, The creation of Middle-earth: The myth behind the man, Pearce traces the development of Tolkien's legendarium from its earliest linguistic experiments through his early poems to The Silmarillion and the mature mythology of Middle-earth. Pearce argues that Tolkien's mythology emerged not as escapism but as a coherent artistic and theological project rooted in language, history, and cosmology.

Chapter 7 Orthodoxy in Middle-earth: The truth behind the myth, focuses on the theological dimensions of Tolkien's fiction. Pearce contends that Middle-earth embodies a profoundly Catholic moral structure, even in the absence of explicit religious references. Themes such as providence, grace, humility, sacrifice, free will, the Fall (Melkor/Morgoth, orcs, Ilúvatar) and redemption are interpreted as reflections of Christian orthodoxy embedded within the narrative architecture of Tolkien's works.

In Chapter 8, The well and the shadows: Tolkien and the critics, Pearce surveys critical responses to Tolkien, contrasting what he views as superficial or ideologically driven readings with more sympathetic interpretations and appreciation of mythic and theological vision. The chapter defends Tolkien against accusations of escapism, allegory, and reactionism, as Pearce argues that much criticism fails to appreciate the depth of Tolkien's mythic and theological vision and confusing serious mythopoeia with mere fantasy.

In Chapter 9, Tolkien as hobbit: Englishman behind the myth, Pearce builds around Tolkien's self‑description as "a hobbit in all but size", as the chapter explores Tolkien's English identity, rural sensibilities, and affection for pre-industrial culture. Pearce connects Tolkien's love of the English countryside, language, and tradition to the creation of the Shire and hobbit culture. The chapter presents Tolkien's literary imagination as inseparable from his cultural rootedness and historical consciousness.

The final Chapter 10, Approaching Mount Doom: Tolkien's final years, covers Tolkien's later life, including the publication and reception of The Lord of the Rings, his unexpected fame and Tolkien's ambivalence of it, and the challenges of completing The Silmarillion. Pearce portrays Tolkien's final years as marked by both public recognition and personal loss (especially Edith's death). The chapter concludes by reflecting on Tolkien's enduring legacy as a myth-maker whose work transcended the cultural fragmentation of his century.

The book ends with Epilogue: Above all shadows rides the sun, which reiterates Pearce's central thesis: that Tolkien's life and work form a coherent spiritual and artistic testimony grounded in Catholic Christianity. Pearce presents Tolkien as a writer whose mythopoeic vision offers hope amid 20th-century turmoil.

== Reception ==
Joel A. Scandrett reviewed the book for VII: Journal of the Marion E. Wade Center. The review describes Tolkien: Man and Myth as a significant contribution to Tolkien scholarship, particularly for its sustained focus on the influence of J. R. R. Tolkien's Roman Catholic faith on his life and works. The reviewer notes that Pearce's central argument—that Tolkien cannot be fully understood apart from his Catholicism—is well supported by biographical evidence, Tolkien's correspondence, and close readings of his fiction. Particular praise is given to the chapters analyzing The Silmarillion, where Pearce draws parallels between Tolkien's mythology and Christian themes such as creation, fall, and redemption, as well as concepts of sub-creation and eucatastrophe. At the same time, the review identifies several shortcomings. The book is described as overly brief for its ambitious scope, resulting in a somewhat fragmented structure marked by chronological digressions. The reviewer also criticizes Pearce's defensive tone toward hostile critics and argues that his portrayal of Tolkien's Catholicism as consciously doctrinal is misleading. Instead, the reviewer maintains that Tolkien's theology emerged organically from personal faith rather than deliberate theological alignment. Despite these criticisms, the review concludes that Tolkien: Man and Myth remains a valuable and generally persuasive study, "especially for those who seek to understand Tolkien from a religious perspective".

The Polish translation of the book was reviewed by Wojciech Chudziński for Świat Gier Komputerowych. He described it as a work of interest not only to fans of The Lord of the Rings but to readers seeking to understand J. R. R. Tolkien as both a person and a thinker. Pearce is described as portraying Tolkien in multiple roles—academic, husband, father, and writer—while also emphasizing his function as a creator and interpreter of myth. According to the reviewer, the book situates Tolkien's work within a broader reflection on myth as a vital means of exploring fundamental human questions, such as identity, morality, and the struggle between good and evil. Chudziński argues that Tolkien's literary achievement lay in restoring fantasy and fairy tales as forms of serious literature for adults, countering their marginalization as children's stories. Pearce's book is thus seen as highlighting Tolkien's role in reaffirming the cultural and spiritual importance of myth, suggesting that without myths and legends, modern humanity risks losing a sense of meaning, origin, and direction.

Bradley J. Birzer writes in The J. R. R. Tolkien Encyclopedia that since 1984 scholars had hardly discussed Tolkien's Catholicism until Pearce's Tolkien: Man and Myth, describing the book as "outstanding", treating The Lord of the Rings as a "theological thriller" that "inspired a whole new wave of Christian evaluations"; Stratford Caldecott made a similar point in The Chesterton Review. Caldecott noted that Peace's work is not intended to be a comprehensive biography, rather, among other things, it gives focus to Tolkien's religiosity.

== See also ==
- Christianity in Middle-earth
- Tolkien's moral dilemma
