= Notre-Dame-d'Allençon =

- Part of Terranjou
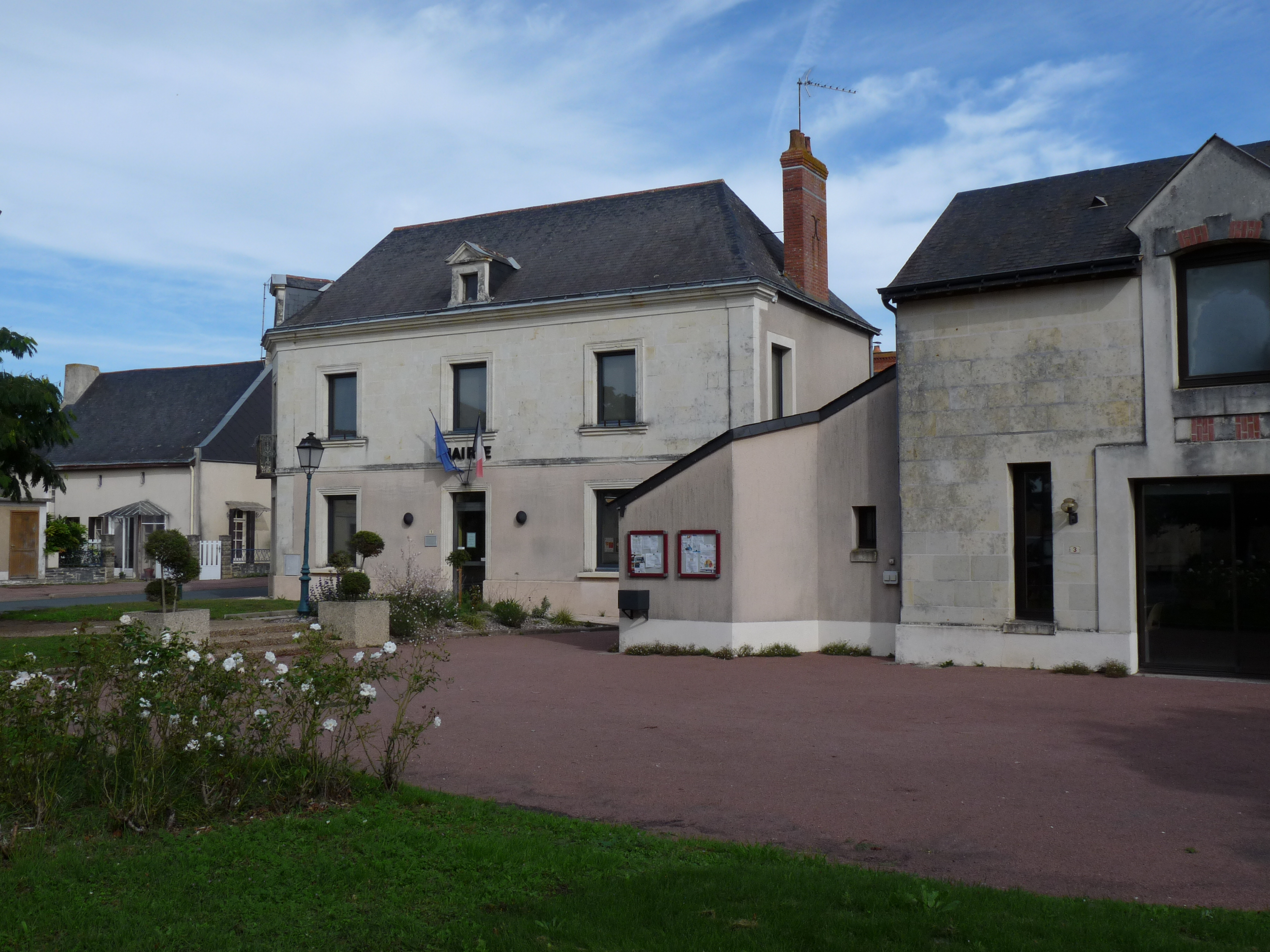
- Notre-Dame-d'Allençon Town hall
- Location of Notre-Dame-d'Allençon
- Location within France Location within Pays de la Loire
- Coordinates: 47°18′11″N 0°26′55″W
- Country: France
- Region: Pays de la Loire
- Department: Maine-et-Loire
- Arrondissement: Angers
- Canton: Chemillé-Melay
- Commune: Terranjou
- Area^{1}: 13.63 km^{2} (5.26 sq mi)
- Elevation: 63 m (207 ft)
- Highest elevation: 94 m (308 ft)
- Lowest elevation: 43 m (141 ft)
- Population (2022): 748
  - Density: 54.9/km^{2} (142/sq mi)
- Demonym(s): Allençonnais, Allençonnaise
- Time zone: UTC+01:00 (CET)
  - Summer (DST): UTC+02:00 (CEST)
- Postal code: 49380
- ^{1} French Land Register data, which excludes lakes, ponds, glaciers > 1 km^{2} (0.386 sq mi or 247 acres) and river estuaries.

Notre-Dame-d'Allençon (French pronunciation: [nɔtʁ dam dalɑ̃sɔ̃]) is a former commune in the Maine-et-Loire department in western France. On 1 January 2017, it was merged into the new commune Terranjou.

== History ==
=== Mayors ===
Since becoming a part of Terranjou, Ginette Rocher has been the deputy mayor of Notre-Dame-d'Allençon.

All mayors of Notre-Dame-d'Allençon
Mayor from	Mayor until	Name
March 2008	present	Ginette Rocher
January 2001	March 2008	Pierre-Louis Légé
1808	1830	Philippe de Maillé de La Tour-Landry

== See also ==
- Communes of the Maine-et-Loire department
