= The Magic Ring =

1812 novel by Friedrich de la Motte Fouqué

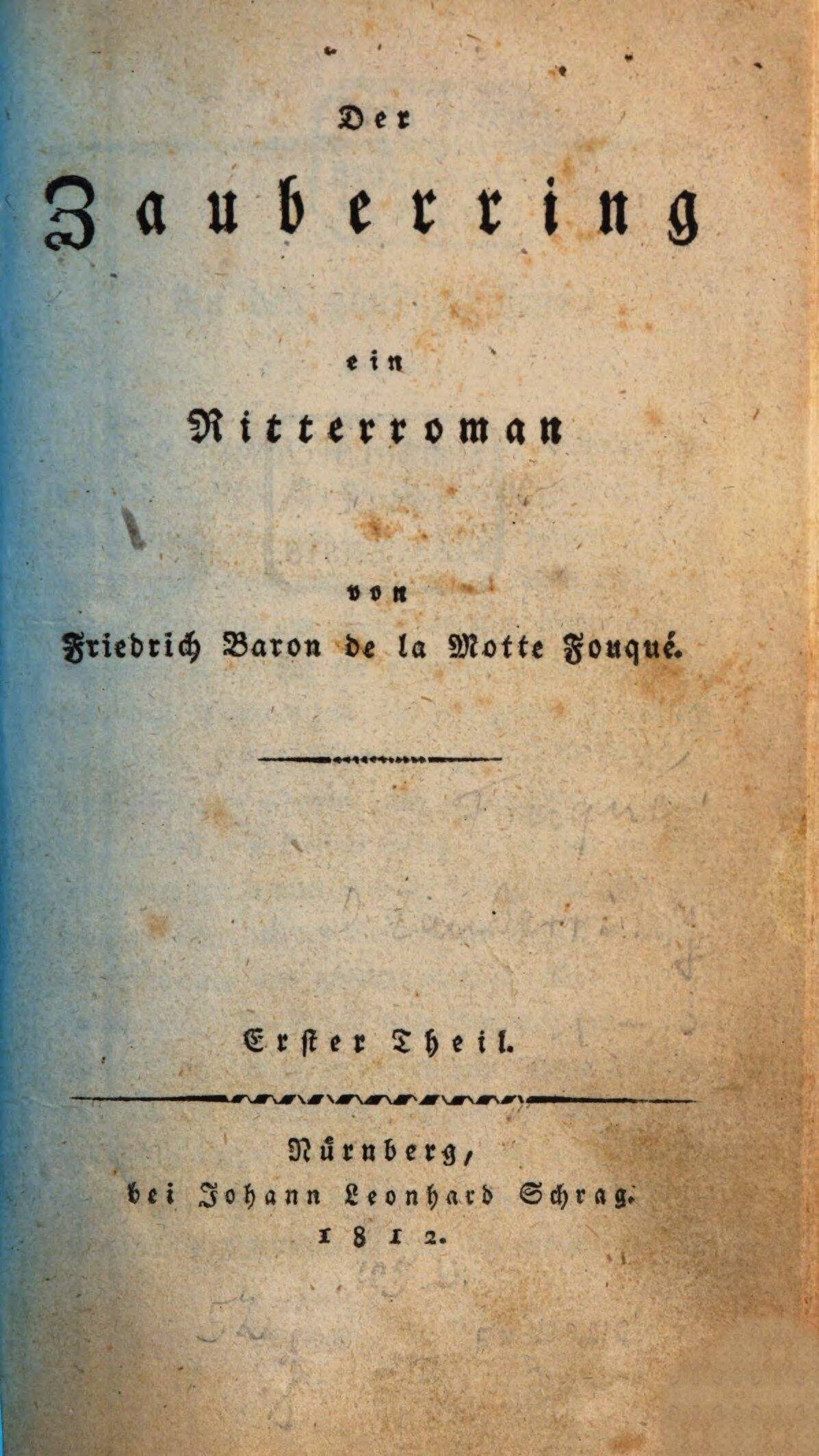
- Title page of the first volume, 1812
- Author: Friedrich de la Motte Fouqué
- Original title: Der Zauberring
- Translator: Robert Pearse Gillies
- Language: German
- Genre: chivalric romance
- Publisher: Johann Leonhard Schrag
- Publication date: 1812
- Publication place: Bavaria
- English publication date: 1825
- Pages: 608 (1812)

The Magic Ring: A Knightly Romance (German: Der Zauberring. Ein Ritterroman) is an 1812 novel by the Geman writer Friedrich de la Motte Fouqué. It is a chivalric romance about a medieval knight who searches for a magic ring and participates in a crusade to Finland. It was Fouqué's most popular historical novel.

== Plot ==
The story is set in an idealised version of medieval Europe and uses tropes from chivalric romances. It revolves around a German knight, Otto, who tries to obtain a ring with magic properties so he can return it to a lady who has lost it. He soon becomes involved in a series of intrigues and ends up participating in the Northern Crusades, fighting pagans in the dark forests of the Finnish borderlands.

== Publication ==
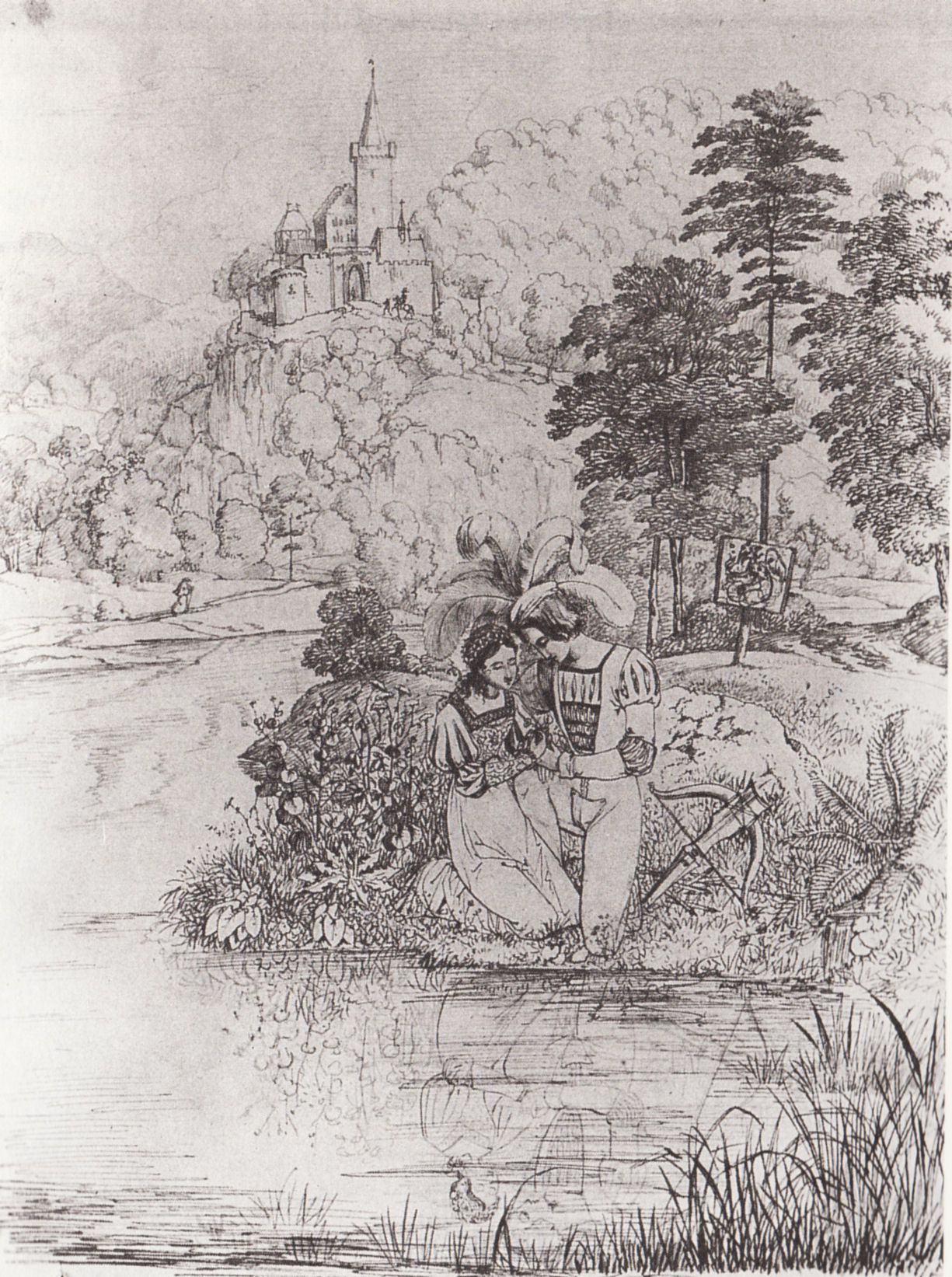
Otto and Bertha at the Danube shore, illustration by Karl Philipp Fohr

The novel was first published in three volumes by Johann Leonhard Schrag in Nuremberg in 1812. It was commercially successful and a second, revised edition was published in 1816. It was published in English translation by Robert Pearse Gillies in 1825. Valancourt Books republished Gillies' version in 2006, and again in 2010 with original illustrations by Jef Murray.

== Reception ==
The Magic Ring was the most popular of Fouqué's historical novels in his own time.

Because of its plot, prose style and Gothic elements, The Magic Ring often came to be called Romantic, beginning already in the 19th century. In 1987, the scholar Frank Rainer Max called it "the romantic knightly novel per excellence". The scholar Detlef Kremer wrote in 2003 that it is the most typical chivalric novel of its time, but associates its themes less with Romanticism and more with a political mission of European unity, most clearly expressed through Otto's father, the knight Hugh von Trautwangen. He has five sons with five different women, each of a different European nationality, resulting in a European family rooted in Christianity and conservatism. Kremer ties the novel to the themes of the Congress of Vienna and Concert of Europe, and contrasts it with the tolerance principle of Gotthold Ephraim Lessing's Nathan the Wise.

Georges T. Dodds of SF Site wrote in 2006 that "the bulk of the complex story" is similar to the fantasy works of William Morris, but with "better pace, less of the slanting sunlight through the bedewed forest depictions, and far fewer archaisms". Dodds wrote that the strong Christian message and reliance on coincidences sometimes make The Magic Ring alien to contemporary readers, but these are characteristics of the chivalric romance genre, and overall it "remains a very readable and entertaining novel, with numerous twists and turns, mysteries and secrets revealed, drawing and ably combining several rich myth-traditions".

== Adaptations ==
Chapter 19 features a Spanish man named Don Hernandez who sings ballads about his homeland. Franz Schubert set these to music as the three songs of his Don Gayseros cycle, dated to the end of 1815 and first published in the 1894 Gesamtausgabe.
