= Joseph Pearce =

British-American Catholic writer (born 1961)

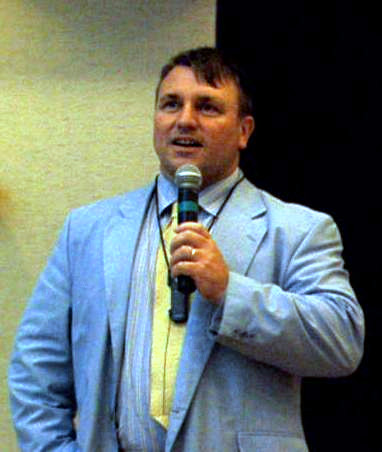
- Pearce in 2007
- Born: February 12, 1961 (age 65); East London, England
- Occupations: Biographer, literary critic
- Website: jpearce.co

Joseph Pearce (born February 12, 1961) is a British-born American writer who serves as director of the Center for Faith and Culture at Aquinas College in Nashville, Tennessee. He previously held positions at Ave Maria College in Ypsilanti, Michigan, and Ave Maria University in Ave Maria, Florida. He is a co-editor of the St. Austin Review.

Pearce has written biographies of literary figures, often Christian, including William Shakespeare, J. R. R. Tolkien, Oscar Wilde, C. S. Lewis, G. K. Chesterton, Aleksandr Solzhenitsyn and Hilaire Belloc.

== Biography ==
=== Early life ===
Joseph Pearce was born in Barking, London, and brought up in Haverhill, Suffolk. His father, Albert Arthur Pearce, was a heavy drinker with a history of brawling in pubs with Irishmen and non-Whites, had an encyclopedic knowledge of English poetry and British military history, and an intense nostalgia for the vanished British Empire. In 1973 the family moved back to Barking in the East End of London, so that the Pearce boys would grow up with Cockney accents. Pearce had been a compliant pupil at the school in Haverhill, but at Eastbury comprehensive school in Barking he led the racist disruption of the lessons taught by a young Pakistani British mathematics teacher.

=== Early political activity ===
At 15, Pearce joined the youth wing of the National Front, an antisemitic and white supremacist political party advocating the compulsory repatriation of all legal immigrants and British-born non-Whites. He came to prominence in 1977 when he set up Bulldog, the NF's openly racist newspaper. Like his father, Pearce became an enthusiastic supporter of Ulster Loyalism during the Troubles from 1978, and joined the Orange Order, a Protestant secret society closely linked to Ulster Loyalist paramilitary organizations. In 1980, he became editor of Nationalism Today, advocating white supremacy. Pearce was twice prosecuted and imprisoned under the Race Relations Act of 1976 for his writings, in 1981 and 1985.

At one stage, Pearce contacted John Tyndall to suggest coalition talks with the British National Party, but Tyndall rejected the plan. Pearce was a close associate of Nick Griffin, whom he helped to oust Martin Webster from the NF's leadership. As a spokesman for the Strasserite Political Soldier faction within the NF, Pearce argued for white supremacy, publishing the Fight for Freedom! pamphlet in 1984. At the same time, however, Pearce adopted the group's support for ethnopluralism, contacting the Iranian embassy in London in 1984 in a vain attempt to secure funding from the Government of the Islamic Republic of Iran. Pearce became a leading member of a new NF political faction known as the Flag Group, writing for its publications and contributing to its ideology. Pearce notably argued, based on the writings of G.K. Chesterton and Hilaire Belloc, for distributism as an alternative to both Marxism and Laissez faire Capitalism in a 1987 article for the party magazine Vanguard.

=== Conversion ===
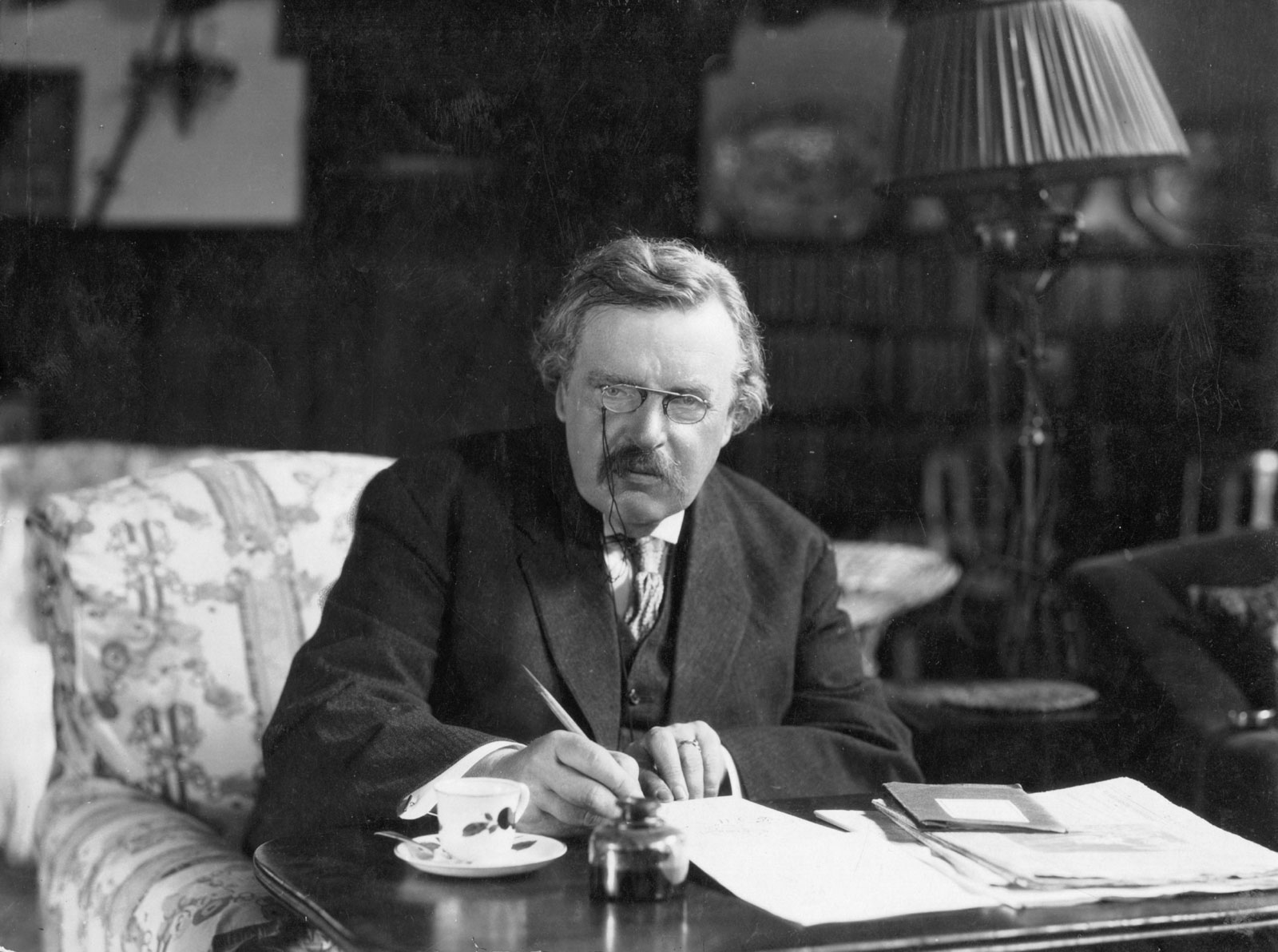
Pearce's conversion to Catholicism was influenced by the writings of G. K. Chesterton.

Pearce converted to Catholicism during his second prison term (1985–1986). He was received into the Catholic Church during Mass at Our Lady Mother of God Church in Norwich, England on Saint Joseph's Day, 19 March 1989. Following the Mass, the women of the parish held a surprise party for Pearce, accompanied by a cake with, "Welcome Home, Joe", emblazoned on it. Pearce has attributed his conversion to reading books by Catholic authors G. K. Chesterton, John Henry Newman, J.R.R. Tolkien, and Hilaire Belloc.

=== Biographer ===
==== Catholic subjects ====
As a Catholic author, Pearce has focused mainly on the life and work of English Catholic writers, such as J. R. R. Tolkien, G. K. Chesterton and Hilaire Belloc. The Guardian commented that Old Thunder: A Life of Hilaire Belloc "skates over" Belloc's antisemitism, "the central disfiguring fact of his oeuvre".

He chose the pen name "Robert Williamson" after a character in the Ulster Loyalist ballad The Old Orange Flute, who, like Pearce, is an Orange Order member who converts to Catholicism. (Note: Pearce 2013, pp. 208–212) Pearce's biography of G. K. Chesterton, Wisdom and Innocence: A Life of G. K. Chesterton, was published, under the pseudonym of Robert Williamson, by Hodder and Stoughton in 1996. Jay P. Corrin, reviewing the book for The Catholic Historical Review, called it "a venture of love and high praise", but which adds little to existing biographies. Its contribution, Corrin wrote, is its focus on Chesterton's religious vision and personal relationships, contrasting his friendly style with the combative Belloc.

Pearce's 2000 biography The Unmasking of Oscar Wilde focused on the conflict between Oscar Wilde's homosexuality and his lifelong attraction to the Catholic Church and how it was finally settled by his reception into the Church on his deathbed in Paris.

In a review for The Wildean Michael Seeney described Pearce's biography as "badly written and muddled", "woefully poorly annotated" and using "odd sources without question". Seeney wrote that it "does not 'unmask' anything", but contains too much "cod psychology" and "hyperbolic cliché" to be a "workmanlike biography".

In 2001, Pearce published a biography of Anglo-South African poet and Catholic convert Roy Campbell, followed in 2003 by an edited anthology of Campbell's poetry and verse translations.

===== Tolkien =====
Pearce has written and published a variety of books of Tolkien studies. His essay Letting the Catholic Out of the Baggins discusses why. In 1997, the British people, in a nationwide poll by the Folio Society, voted The Lord of the Rings the greatest book of the 20th century and the outraged reactions of literary celebrities such as Howard Jacobson, Griff Rhys Jones, and Germaine Greer, inspired Pearce to write the books Tolkien: Man and Myth (1998), Tolkien, a Celebration (1999) and Bilbo's Journey: Discovering the Hidden Meaning in The Hobbit (2012). All of Pearce's Tolkien-themed books consider his subject's person and writings from a Catholic perspective. Bradley J. Birzer writes in The J. R. R. Tolkien Encyclopedia that scholars had hardly discussed Tolkien's Catholicism until Pearce's Tolkien: Man and Myth, describing the book as "outstanding", treating The Lord of the Rings as a "theological thriller" that "inspired a whole new wave of Christian evaluations".

Pearce has credited his previously published books of Tolkien studies and "the wave of Tolkien enthusiasm" caused by Peter Jackson's film adaptation of The Lord of the Rings, with making him into a celebrity intellectual following his 2001 emigration from England to the United States.

=== Move to the United States ===
In 2001, Pearce was hired at Ave Maria College in Michigan. The Pearces arrived in the United States on September 7. Pearce recalls that his first day of teaching coincided with the September 11 attacks, "making my arrival in the States something of a baptism of fire." (Note: Pearce 2013, pp. 226–229) The first issue of the Catholic literary magazine the St. Austin Review, which Pearce has coedited ever since alongside Robert Asch, was also published in September 2001.

Pearce was the host of the 2009 EWTN television series The Quest for Shakespeare. Based upon his eponymous book, the show is concerned with Pearce's belief that Shakespeare was a Catholic.

In 2014, Pearce was hired as director of the Center for Faith and Culture at Aquinas College in Nashville, Tennessee. In his 2017 stage play Death Comes for the War Poets, according to Catholic Arts Today, Pearce weaves "a verse tapestry," about the military and spiritual journeys of war poets Siegfried Sassoon and Wilfred Owen.

In a 2022 interview with Pearce, Polish journalist Anna Szyda from the literary magazine Magna Polonia explained that the nihilism of modern American poetry is widely noticed and commented upon in the Third Polish Republic as reflecting, "the deleterious influence of the contemporary civilisation on the American soul." In response, Pearce described "the neo-formalist revival" inspired by the late Richard Wilbur and how it has been reflected in recent verse by the Catholic poets whom he and Robert Asch publish in the St. Austin Review. Pearce said that the Catholic faith and optimism of the younger generation of Catholic poets made him feel hope for the future.

In July 2022, Pearce was a speaker at the 41st Annual Conference of the American Chesterton Society in Milwaukee, Wisconsin. Pearce's lecture was titled "How Chesterton Saved Me from anti-Semitism".

== Personal life ==
Pearce married Susannah Brown, an Irish-American woman with family roots in Dungannon, County Tyrone, at St. Peter's Catholic Church in Steubenville, Ohio, in April 2001. They have two children. In a 2014 essay, Pearce announced that he had become an American citizen.

== Works ==
=== Publications ===
- Skrewdriver: The First Ten Years: The Way It's Got to Be!. London: Skrewdriver Services. 1987.
- Wisdom and Innocence: A Life of G. K. Chesterton. London: Hodder & Stoughton. 1996. ISBN 0-340-67132-7.
- The Three Ys Men. London: Saint Austin Press. 1998. ISBN 1-901157-02-4.
- Tolkien: Man and Myth. London: HarperCollins. 1998. ISBN 0-00-274018-4.
- Literary Converts: Spiritual Inspiration in an Age of Unbelief. London: HarperCollins. 1999. ISBN 0-00-628111-7.
- Tolkien: A Celebration. Collected Writings on a Literary Legacy. London: Fount. 1999. ISBN 0-00-628120-6.
- Flowers of Heaven: 1000 years of Christian Verse. London: Hodder & Stoughton. 1999. ISBN 0-340-72220-7.
- Solzhenitsyn: A Soul in Exile. London: HarperCollins. 1999. ISBN 0-00-274040-0.
- The Unmasking of Oscar Wilde. London: HarperCollins. 2000. ISBN 0-00-274042-7.
- Bloomsbury and Beyond: The Friends and Enemies of Roy Campbell. London: HarperCollins. 2001. ISBN 0-00-274092-3. Published in the United States as Unafraid of Virginia Woolf: The Friends and Enemies of Roy Campbell. Wilmington, Delaware: ISI Books. 2004. ISBN 978-1-932236-36-1.
- Small Is Still Beautiful. London: HarperCollins. 2001. ISBN 0-00-274090-7. Published in the United States as Small Is Still Beautiful: Economics as if Families Mattered. Wilmington, Delaware: ISI Books. 2006. ISBN 978-1-933859-05-7. (Book Review and Summary)
- Campbell, Roy (2001). Pearce, Joseph (ed.). Selected Poems. London: Saint Austin. ISBN 1-901157-59-8.
- Old Thunder: A Life of Hilaire Belloc. London: HarperCollins. 2002. ISBN 0-00-274096-6.
- C. S. Lewis and the Catholic Church. San Francisco: Ignatius Press. 2003. ISBN 0-89870-979-2.
- Literary Giants, Literary Catholics. San Francisco: Ignatius Press. 2005. ISBN 978-1-58617-077-6.
- The Quest for Shakespeare: The Bard of Avon and the Church of Rome. San Francisco: Ignatius Press. 2008. ISBN 978-1-58617-224-4.
- Divining Divinity: A Book of Poems. Kaufmann Publishing. 2008. ISBN 978-0-9768580-1-0.
- Through Shakespeare's Eyes: Seeing the Catholic Presence in the Plays. San Francisco: Ignatius Press. 2010. ISBN 978-1-58617-413-2.
- Bilbo's Journey: Discovering the Hidden Meaning in The Hobbit. Charlotte, North Carolina: Saint Benedict Press. 2012. ISBN 978-1-61890-058-6.
- Shakespeare on Love. San Francisco: Ignatius Press. 2013. ISBN 978-1-58617-684-6.
- Candles in the Dark: The Authorized Biography of Fr. Ho Lung and the Missionaries of the Poor. Charlotte, North Carolina: Saint Benedict Press. 2013. ISBN 978-1-61890-398-3.
- Race with the Devil: My Journey from Racial Hatred to Rational Love. Charlotte, North Carolina: Saint Benedict Press. 2013. ISBN 978-1-61890-065-4.
- Beauteous Truth: Faith, Reason, Literature and Culture. South Bend, Indiana: St. Augustine's Press. 2014. ISBN 978-1-58731-067-6.
- Frodo's Journey: Discover The Hidden Meaning Of The Lord Of The Rings. Charlotte, North Carolina: Saint Benedict Press. 2015. ISBN 978-1618906755.
- Poems Every Catholic Should Know. Gastonia, North Carolina: TAN Books. 2016. ISBN 978-1505108620.
- Merrie England: A Journey Through the Shire. Charlotte, North Carolina: Saint Benedict Press. 2016. ISBN 978-1-50510-719-7.
- Monaghan: A Life. Charlotte, North Carolina: Saint Benedict Press. 2016. ISBN 978-1-50510-890-3.
- Further Up & Further In: Understanding Narnia. Gastonia, North Carolina: TAN Books. 2018. ISBN 978-1505108668.
- Literature: What Every Catholic Should Know. Greenwood Village, Colorado: Augustine Institute. 2019. ISBN 978-1733522120.
- Benedict XVI: Defender of the Faith. Gastonia, North Carolina: TAN Books. 2022. ISBN 978-1618907363.
- Faith of Our Fathers: A History of True England. San Francisco, California: Ignatius Press. 2022. ISBN 978-1621644354.
- Foreword to The Cenacle Press's 2023 republication of Robert Hugh Benson's The King's Achievement.
- Foreword to Os Justi Press's 2023 republication of Hilaire Belloc's The Cruise of the 'Nona'.
