= Saint Austin Press =

British Roman Catholic publishing house

- Founded: 1996
- Founder: Ferdi McDermott
- Country of origin: United Kingdom
- Key people: Editor: Robert Asch
- Publication types: Books
- Official website: http://www.saintaustinpress.com/

Saint Austin Press is a British Roman Catholic publishing house founded in 1996. Its editor-in-chief is Robert Asch.

In its first ten years of operation, when it was based in Brockley, Saint Austin Press published around 50 books on various themes as diverse as William Shakespeare, hagiography, Freemasonry, floristry, liturgy, Scripture, Apologetics, fiction and poetry. Its underlying message has been the communication of Catholic values and teaching through the promotion of Christian culture in general. It was notable for publishing Ad Completorium which contained the complete text and music for Compline according to the Roman Catholic Breviary of 1961.

In 2001, the Press launched a monthly review of culture, the St. Austin Review, carrying learned and more popular articles on cultural themes viewed from a Catholic perspective. The StAR came about after negotiations for the Press to purchase The Month and continue publishing the title ended in failure. The Month finally closed in the same year, having been for over a century a popular cultural forum for Catholic writers in the UK. StAR was subsequently acquired by Ave Maria University in the United States, before moving its home to St Augustine's Press.

Saint Austin Press launched its new website with a selection of new titles in July 2021.
