= Martigné-Briand =

- Part of Terranjou
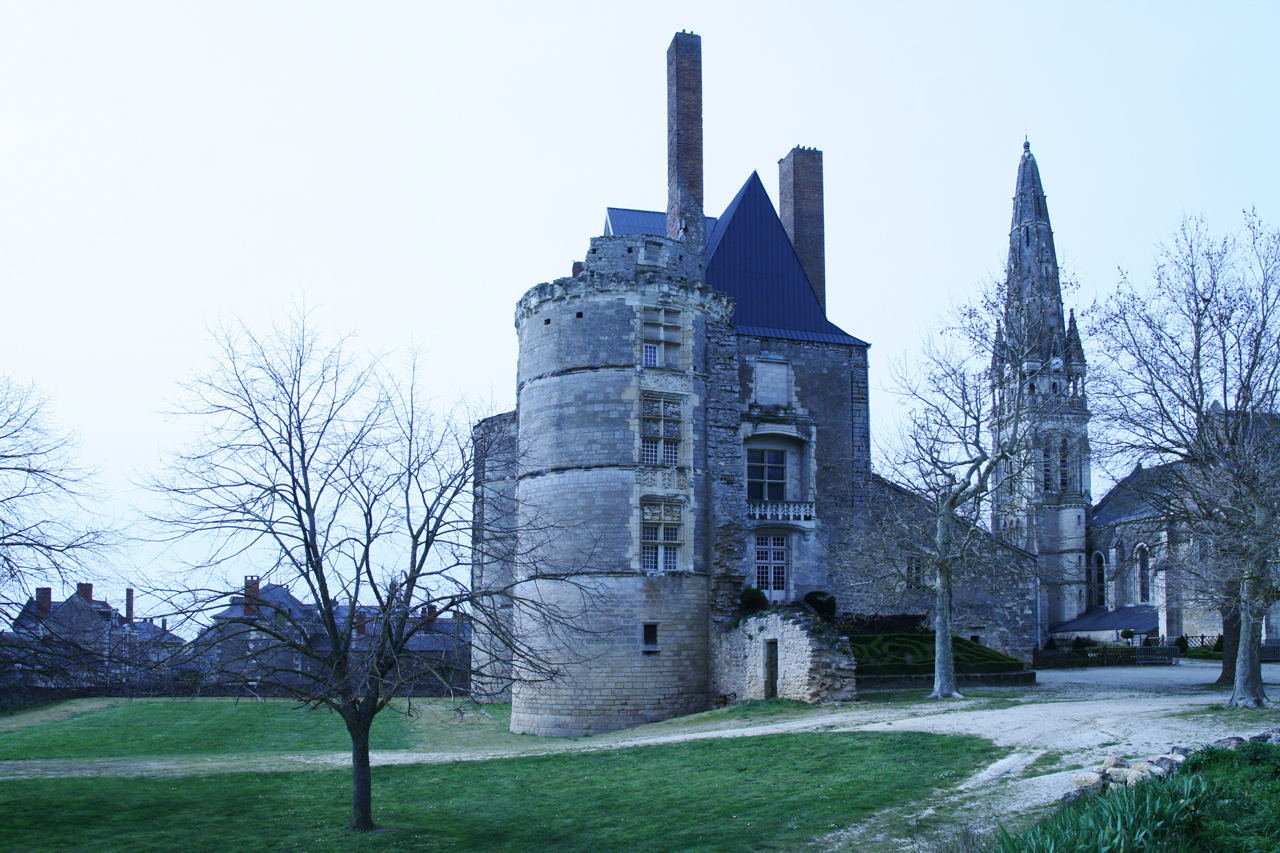
- The chateau of Martigné-Briand

- Coat of arms
- Location of Martigné-Briand
- Location within France Location within Pays de la Loire
- Coordinates: 47°14′02″N 0°25′44″W
- Country: France
- Region: Pays de la Loire
- Department: Maine-et-Loire
- Arrondissement: Angers
- Canton: Chemillé-Melay
- Commune: Terranjou
- Area^{1}: 27.21 km^{2} (10.51 sq mi)
- Elevation: 59 m (194 ft)
- Highest elevation: 94 m (308 ft)
- Lowest elevation: 26 m (85 ft)
- Population (2022): 1,873
  - Density: 68.83/km^{2} (178.3/sq mi)
- Demonym(s): Martinéen, Martinéenne
- Time zone: UTC+01:00 (CET)
  - Summer (DST): UTC+02:00 (CEST)
- Postal code: 49540
- ^{1} French Land Register data, which excludes lakes, ponds, glaciers > 1 km^{2} (0.386 sq mi or 247 acres) and river estuaries.

Martigné-Briand (French pronunciation: [maʁtiɲe bʁijɑ̃]) is a former commune in the Maine-et-Loire department in western France. On 1 January 2017, it was merged into the new commune Terranjou.

== Geography ==
The commune is traversed by the river Layon.

== See also ==
- Communes of the Maine-et-Loire department
