= Chavagnes-en-Paillers =

- Commune
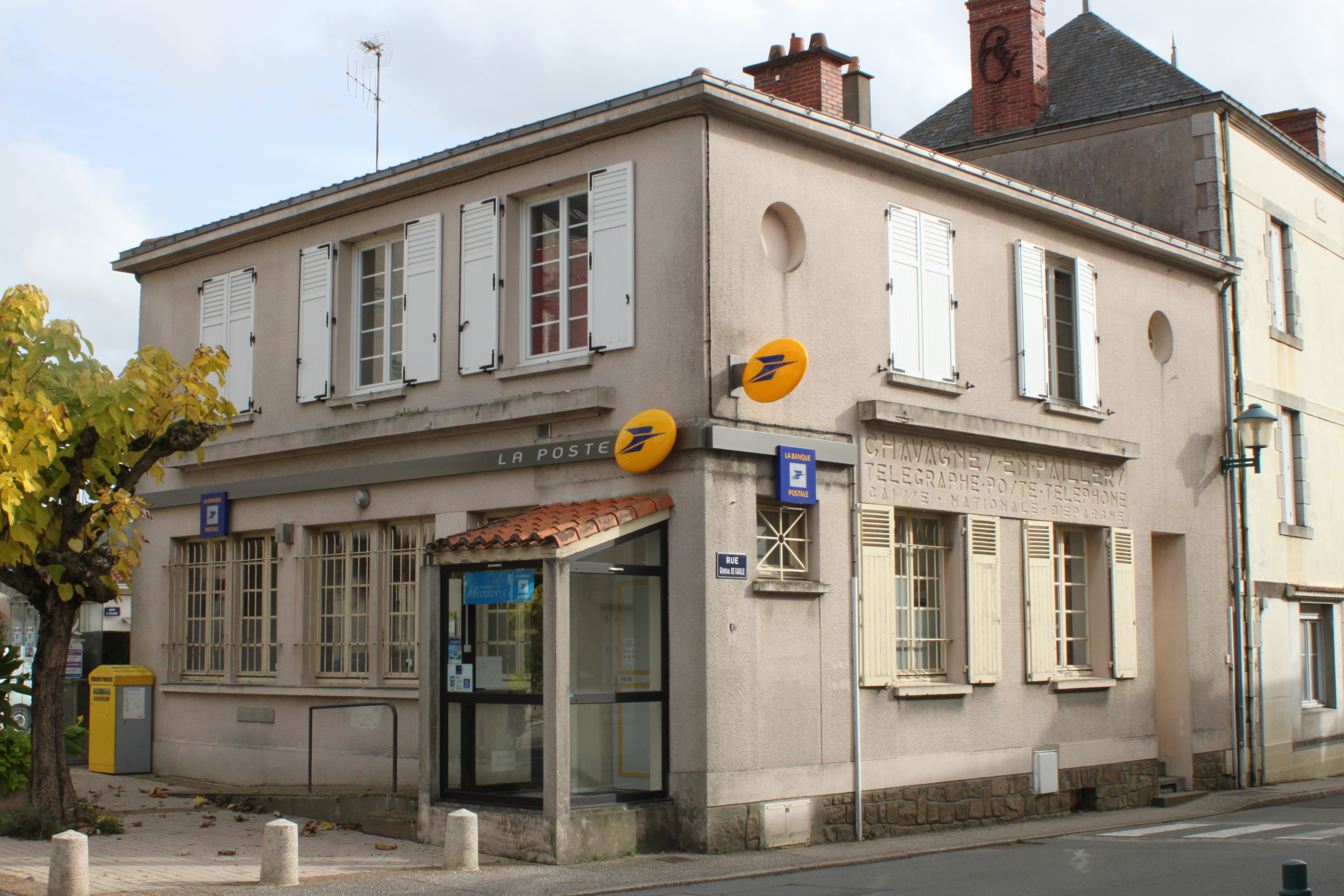
- The post office in Chavagnes-En-Paillers

- Coat of arms
- Location of Chavagnes-en-Paillers
- Location within France Location within Pays de la Loire
- Coordinates: 46°53′36″N 1°15′05″W
- Country: France
- Region: Pays de la Loire
- Department: Vendée
- Arrondissement: La Roche-sur-Yon
- Canton: Montaigu-Vendée
- Intercommunality: Pays de Saint-Fulgent - Les Essarts

Government
  - Mayor (2020–2026): Éric Salaün
- Area^{1}: 40.57 km^{2} (15.66 sq mi)
- Highest elevation: 92 m (302 ft)
- Lowest elevation: 36 m (118 ft)
- Population (2023): 3,726
  - Density: 91.84/km^{2} (237.9/sq mi)
- Time zone: UTC+01:00 (CET)
  - Summer (DST): UTC+02:00 (CEST)
- INSEE/Postal code: 85065 /85250
- ^{1} French Land Register data, which excludes lakes, ponds, glaciers > 1 km^{2} (0.386 sq mi or 247 acres) and river estuaries.

Chavagnes-en-Paillers (French pronunciation: [ʃavaɲ ɑ̃ paje]) is a commune of the Vendée department in the Pays de la Loire region in western France.

Chavagnes en Paillers is known as one of the two villes saintes (holy towns) of the Vendée. (The other is Saint-Laurent-sur-Sèvre). It is home to the mother-houses of two religious congregations: the Sons of Mary Immaculate and the Ursulines of Jesus, both founded by the Roman Catholic priest Louis-Marie Baudouin in about 1802 in the wake of the French Revolution (1789) and the War in the Vendée (mainly 1793-1796).

Still present also in Chavagnes is the seminary Baudouin founded for the training of boys and men destined for the priesthood. It was the first junior seminary to be approved in France after the Revolution. It now continues as Chavagnes International College, an international Catholic boarding school for boys, teaching through the medium of English.

The word Chavagnes is thought to come from the dog Latin cabanas, meaning cabins. The inhabitants are known as Chavagnais.

== Statistics ==
- Altitude: 36 m (mini) – 92 m (maxi)
- Area of the commune of Chavagnes: 40.57 km²

== Population ==
Historical population
Year	Pop.	±% p.a.
1968	2,933	—
1975	2,910	−0.11%
1982	2,909	−0.00%
1990	2,870	−0.17%
1999	2,963	+0.35%
2007	3,249	+1.16%
2012	3,438	+1.14%
2017	3,536	+0.56%
2023	3,726	+0.88%
Source: INSEE

== See also ==
- Communes of the Vendée department
