= Chavagnes International College =

Coordinates: 46.8939°N 1.2516°W

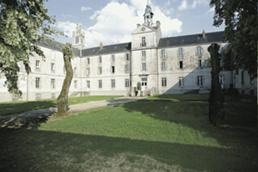
- Rear quadrangle at Chavagnes

Location
- 96 rue du Calvaire; Chavagnes-en-Paillers, 85250; France

Information
- Type: Independent secondary school
- Motto: Latin: In electis tuis mitte radices English: Put down your roots in those you have chosen
- Religious affiliation: Catholicism
- Established: 1802; 224 years ago 2002 (re-fashioned)
- Principal: Ferdi McDermott
- Gender: Boys
- Age: 11 to 18
- Enrolment: 45
- Houses: Cathelineau; Charette; Rochejacquelein; Suzannet
- Colours: Blue, red and gold
- Alumni: Old Chavagnians
- Website: www.chavagnes.org

Chavagnes International College is an independent Catholic secondary school for boys, located in Chavagnes-en-Paillers, France. Founded in 1802 by Louis-Marie Baudouin the school was re-fashioned an "international college" in 2002. The school's language of instruction is English, and it prepares pupils for British GCSEs and A-levels, with the French Brevet and Baccalauréat as options.

The college claims to be a traditional English school in France. Although pupils come from Britain and other English-speaking countries there are also more and more pupils from France. In this international environment, modern languages are particularly strong, with many boys taking GCSE languages (French, German, Spanish, English) one or two years early. Older boys often speak several languages fluently.

== History ==
Chavagnes en Paillers has a long history of association with England, and with a general attitude of welcoming outsiders. The motto on the official arms of the village comes from the 133rd Psalm (Ecce Quam Bonum): 'Habitare fratres in unum' (Behold how good it is for brethren to dwell together in unity.)

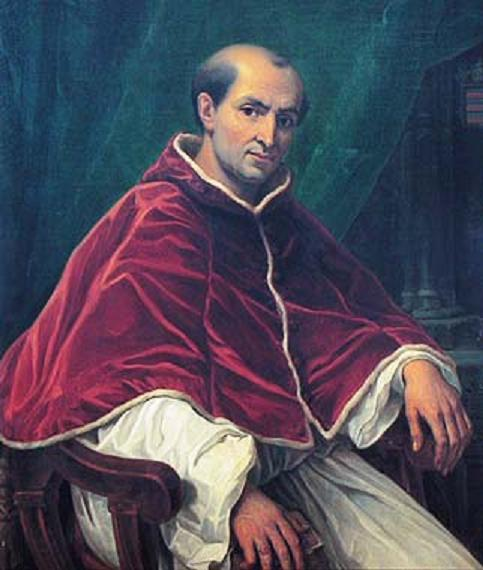
Pope Clement V, the first of Four 'Chavagnes Popes'

The land on which the college is built, near the site of a Roman villa, was given to a community of Benedictine monks in the thirteenth century by the Anglo-French family Harpedan de Belleville, who then ruled the area. The monastery built at that time was dedicated to St Anthony of Egypt (also called St Anthony the Great), the founder of monasticism. The monastery received a canonical visitation from a Papal Legate, Bertrand de Got in the late 12th century. He subsequently became the first Pope at Avignon, Clement V.

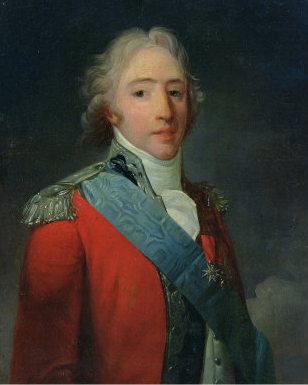
Charles X of France, who authorised the 'Ecclesiastical School of Chavagnes' in 1825.

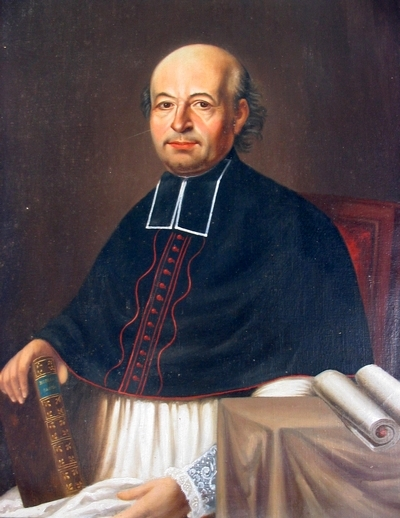
Venerable Louis Marie Baudouin.

In the years that followed, Chavagnes saw many changes and much upheaval. In the nineteenth century, its walls housed the first junior seminary in France after the Revolution, founded by the Venerable Louis-Marie Baudouin in 1802. Father Baudouin recounted a prophecy whispered to him by a dying priest, renowned for his sanctity: "Il y aura toujours un séminaire à Chavagnes" ("There will always be a seminary in Chavagnes"). This legend would later inspire several successful attempts to keep the seminary open against the will of the Emperor Napoleon, the Fourth Republic and the Nazis.

Already recognised by Napoleon, and under the authority of the diocesan bishop, it received a royal charter from Charles X in 1825, as the ‘Ecclesiastical School of Chavagnes’, during the brief period of the restored Bourbon monarchy (1824–30).

The buildings were confiscated from the Church in 1905 as part of the anti-clerical crackdown throughout France. The priests then involved with educating the boys at Chavagnes were exiled to Shaftesbury in Dorset. In 1912 the buildings were bought back by a local aristocrat, the Comte de Suzannet, and reopened as a junior seminary, much to the chagrin of the Paris authorities.

The college was shared between German soldiers and junior seminarians during World War II, housing a small garrison and a military hospital. A machine-gun was placed in the clock tower, dominating the village, but the Nazi soldiers turned a blind eye to more than 50 Jewish children sheltered by local families until the liberation. The villagers were so good at keeping a secret regarding the hidden Jewish children that the information only emerged in the 1990s.

=== Chavagnes of the Popes ===
Shortly after the Second World War the college (then the Petit Séminaire de Chavagnes) received the visit of Angelo Cardinal Roncalli, Papal Nuncio in Paris. The then Mayor, Mr Gilbert de Guerry de Beauregard, gave a welcome speech in which he alluded to the previous visit of a Papal Legate in the 12th Century and mentioned that the last one had become a Pope. He suggested that Cardinal Roncalli might also share the same destiny. Roncalli became Pope John XXIII a few years later. In an interesting turn of events, the Pope of the day, Pius XII, sent a long letter of greeting to the people of Chavagnes, referring to the historic faith of the people of the Vendée area, in the wake of this visit. The letter was signed by a substitute, by the name of Martini, later Pope Paul VI.

In 1997, as had happened many times before in the history of Chavagnes, the building closed its doors for a time. In 1999 the buildings housed 50 refugees from Kosovo. Finally, in September 2002, with the support of the local bishop, a group of English, American, Australian and Irish teachers, led by Ferdi McDermott, reopened the school but with a different, international emphasis.

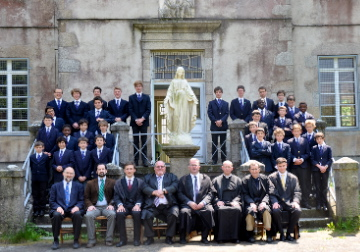
Master and pupils 2012, Chavagnes.

In 2004, two founding Masters of Chavagnes International College, Robert Asch and Ferdi McDermott, were invited to visit Cardinal Ratzinger in Rome. Cardinal Ratzinger blessed rosaries for the boys at the college and expressed the hope that his forthcoming retirement would enable him to work more closely with his visitors. Cardinal Ratzinger became Pope, as Benedict XVI, making him the fourth Pope with a particular link to this remote French village and with its little "ecclesiastical school". In one of his last acts as Pope, Benedict XVI gave the title Venerable to Father Baudouin (the founder of the Petit Séminaire de Chavagnes) on 20 December 2012.

== Arms and motto ==
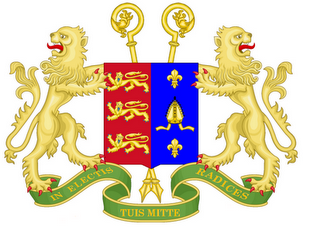
Heraldic achievement of Chavagnes International College

The arms of the college combine those on the second Great Seal of King Richard I of England, used by his successors until 1340 with the French fleurs-de-lis and the ecclesiastical mitre: "Dexter, Gules three lions passant guardant Or; impaled with, sinister, Azure, an episcopal mitre between two fleurs-de-lis Or”.

Richard I of England, Duke of Normandy (as Richard IV), Duke of Aquitaine, Duke of Gascony, Lord of Cyprus, Count of Anjou, Count of Maine, Count of Nantes, and Overlord of Brittany (reigned 1189–1199) ruled Poitou at the time of the foundation of the original monastery in Chavagnes, and founded other monasteries himself in the surrounding area, including a Priory of Grandmont. These arms of England are combined with the right-hand side representing the recognition of the French monarchy under Charles X (by the fleurs de lis) and the patronage of Bishops of Luçon (with the mitre) to this day.

As well as representing England and France, three other levels of symbolism exist in the coat of arms. The two sides of the arms may be taken to represent allegorically the Blessed Trinity and the Blessed Virgin Mary; also on the one hand the theological virtues, on the other the virtue of purity, supported by the Sacraments of the Church. Lastly the supporting lions symbolise heroic courage while the lilies symbolise beauty and the mitre truth and goodness: three values that the courage of the lions must serve if it is to be truly heroic. Echoing these sentiments, the full heraldic achievement features two croziers (one abbatial and one episcopal) and two lions rampant.

The college's motto is In electis tuis mitte radices, 'Put down roots in those Thou hast chosen'. It is a reference to the Book of Sirach (Ecclesiasticus), Chapter 24, verse 13 in which Wisdom is bidden by God to take root among his Elect, the people of Israel. On a nineteenth-century statue of the Virgin and Child, under the devotion Our Lady of the Sceptre in the front Quad of Chavagnes, an inscription attributes the words to the Child Jesus, addressing His mother: 'in electis meis mitte radices' ('put down your roots in my Elect').

== Buildings ==
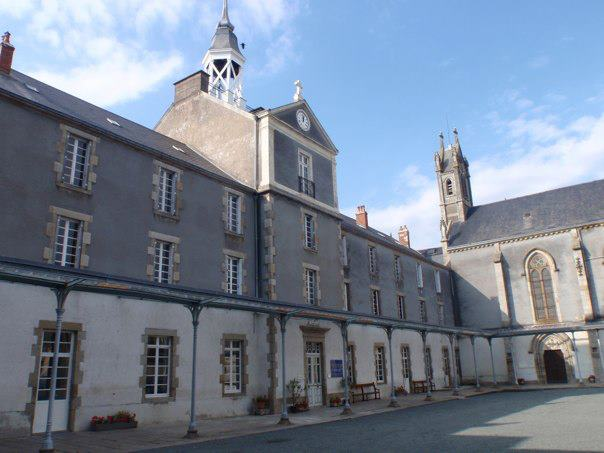
Front Quad at Chavagnes.

There are no surviving vestiges of Roman or medieval buildings on the site, with the possible exception of a small piece of stained glass, bearing an episcopal coat of arms. This is situated in the Father Baudouin memorial chapel, one of three chapels on the site.

All the other buildings date from between about 1700 and the 1960s, with most built between 1820 and 1880. The main building, in the form of a letter H, with various later extensions, is a typical 19th century religious/scholastic building, with a large number of windows on all sides. The college clocktower contains a carillon of 13 bells which may be played with a system of levers. The original makers of the clock (circa 1850), Lussault, are currently repairing it and recasting one of the bells.

The neo-Gothic Chapel was consecrated on October 24, 1866, and dedicated to Our Lady of the Immaculate Conception. It contains five full-size stained glass windows portraying Pentecost, the Finding in the Temple, the Coronation of the Virgin + The Immaculate Conception (with Pius IX pictured), 'Suffer the little children to come unto me' and the Presentation of Our Lady in the Temple, with Ss Joachim and Anna. The sanctuary is oak-panelled with large statues of twelve saints providing a typical gothic 'cloud of witness' as featured in many cathedrals.

The organ, built in the 1880s by the Nantes firm Debierre, is listed in the supplementary register of Historic Monuments. It has two manuals and some interesting extra features, such as a rather dramatic 'storm pedal' which needs to be used sparingly.

The marble altar features sculpted panels depicting our Lord with the Evangelists and Moses distributing manna to the children of Israel. This used to be part of a larger High Altar which was later dismantled to make the usual altar facing the people.

The large and impressive Stations of the Cross, framed in Gothic style, are rather modern in execution. They are painted by a little-known artist, Alfred Sauvage, active in the early 20th century.

There are two other smaller chapels on site: one dedicated to St Joseph, and the Father Baudouin Memorial chapel, dedicated to our Lady. Both are mid-nineteenth century neo-Gothic.

Totalling approximately 130,000 sq ft (12,000 m^{2}), the buildings are too large for the college's current needs and only about 35% is currently in daily use. The buildings stand on approximately 2.5 hectares (6.2 acres). The college sports ground is situated about seven minutes' walk away.

== Masters ==
The teaching staff at the college is mainly composed of Fellows who live in the college and commit to supporting the prayer-life of the institution in addition to their teaching. In addition there are several non-residential teaching staff, local volunteers and some Visiting Fellows. The college has a long-standing relationship with the University of Buckingham and makes use of the university's academic programmes to provide teacher training and ongoing Continuing professional development for its staff. The college is also a Corporate Member of the oldest professional body in education, the College of Teachers in London.

The postgraduate research of the Fellows of the college, the organisation of conferences, various adult education projects in the Liberal Arts and other similar activities outside the scope of the main 11-18 school are part of the Chavagnes Studium, a kind of fledgling university community within the college. From 2016 the Chavagnes Studium is launching a post A-level programme of study in the Liberal Arts.

== Curriculum ==
From September 2007 a bilingual policy was phased in at the lower end of the college. All boys in Year 7 are coached towards basic fluency in English/French and the lessons in other subjects are delivered in a bilingual setting, with most textbooks in English. Chavagnes is a Cambridge school and Years 7-9 follow the Cambridge Junior Secondary curriculum originated by Cambridge International Examinations.

Boys in year 10, of whatever nationality, are given the option of sitting the French brevet exam, as well as the usual raft of Cambridge IGCSE examinations at 15 and 16. All tuition for the GCSE years (Years 10 and 11) and the A-level classes is exclusively in English.

=== Extra-curricular activities ===
Extra-curricular activities include scouts, astronomy, drama, extra modern languages, a dining club for older boys, and a literary club. Boxing and compulsory poetry recitation (by heart) in various languages feature regularly. The college also plays host to a range of traditions with a particularly Catholic and/or English flavour: religious processions, the election of a boy bishop on St Nicholas Day, an annual 110-kilometre (110,000 m) pilgrimage on foot from Paris to Chartres, rising at dawn on May Day to welcome the summer, and rowing in coxed fours.

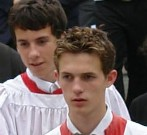
Pupils wearing cassocks

==== Liturgical choir ====
Most boys sing in the Choir and learn Gregorian chant. Other repertoire includes Mozart, Bach and Handel, although renaissance polyphony tends to dominate. The Choir made a tour of Sweden in 2004, visited Sicily in summer 2008 the UK in summer 2009 and Rome in February 2012. In Holy Week 2014 the Choir made a pilgrimage from Tui to Santiago de Compostela (about 110 kilometres (68 mi) on foot over 5 days.) En route they sang three concerts and also sang at a Solemn Mass in the Cathedral of Compostela.

In February 2015 the Choir visited Riga, Latvia, where it sang at Sunday Mass in the Catholic Cathedral as well as the Basilique du Sacré-Cœur de Montmartre, in Paris, where it also sang at Solemn Sunday Mass.

They have made two CDs: Les Choristes de Chavagnes in 2004 and Chantons à Chavagnes in 2008. The Choir sings at Mass for Sundays and Feastdays and also sings concerts for local schools and old peoples' homes.

==== Scouts de Chavagnes ====
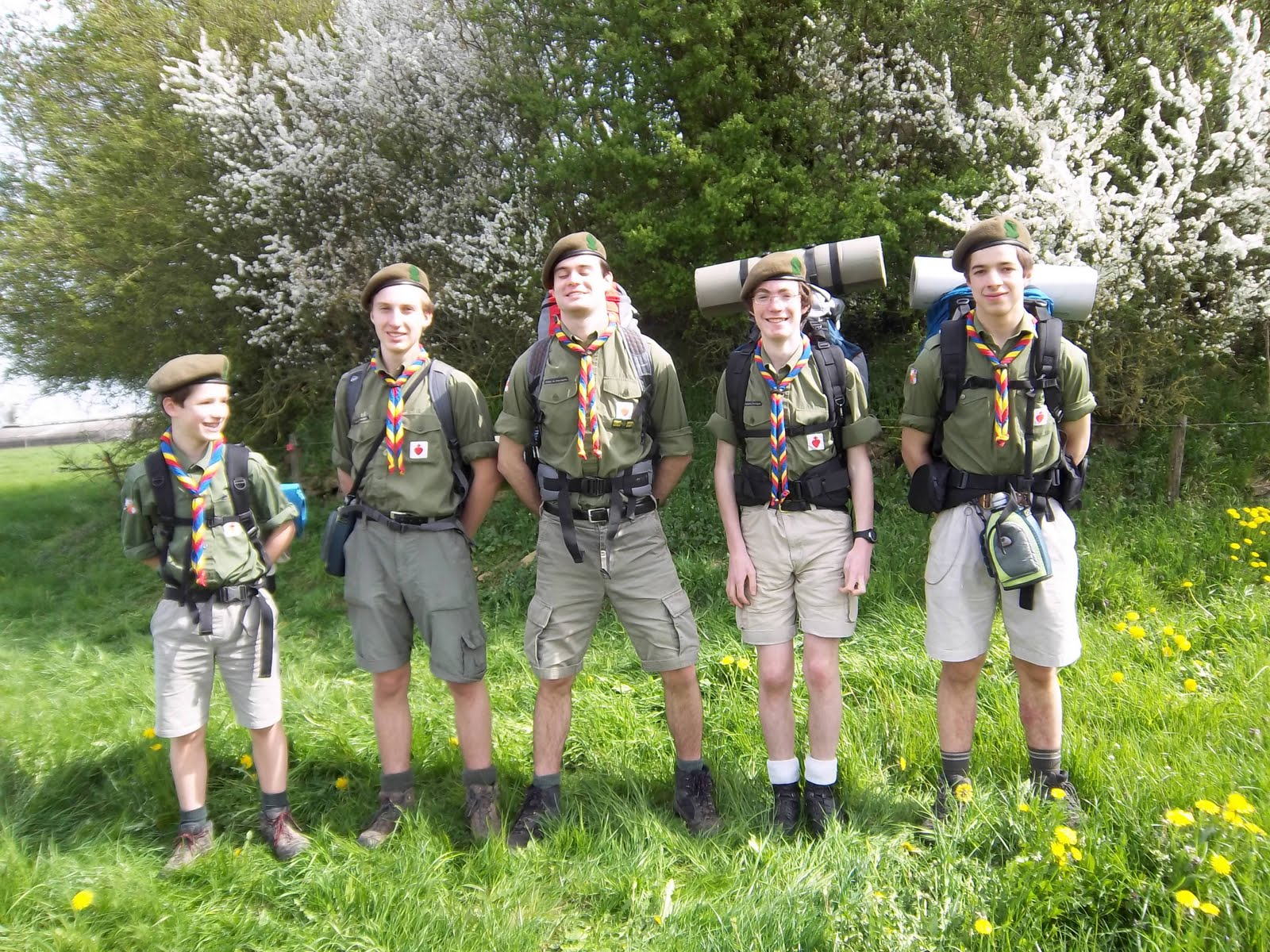
Chavagnes Scouts

The College has its own independent Scout Troop, combining the traditions of English and French Catholic scouting, following the teaching of Father Jacques Sevin SJ, the Father of European Catholic Scouting and friend of Lord Baden Powell. The College Troop takes the name 'Scouts de Chavagnes' and is affiliated to the World Federation of Independent Scouts.

== Media coverage ==
The school was the subject of several documentary programmes in the UK and France. It became quite famous in France in 2004 when its buildings were used in the summer holidays for the filming of a reality show called Le Pensionnat de Chavagnes in which children recreated a school from the 1950s for a month. The four-part series, based on the UK broadcast That'll Teach 'Em, attracted up to eight million viewers across France.

Various articles have appeared in The Daily Telegraph, Sunday Times and other UK and French newspapers over the years. In June 2008 a Reuters article on the college was syndicated worldwide and attracted a great deal of attention. This was followed up by a special feature on Vatican Radio in July 2008. This focussed on the college as a 'Community of faith.'

== Gallery ==
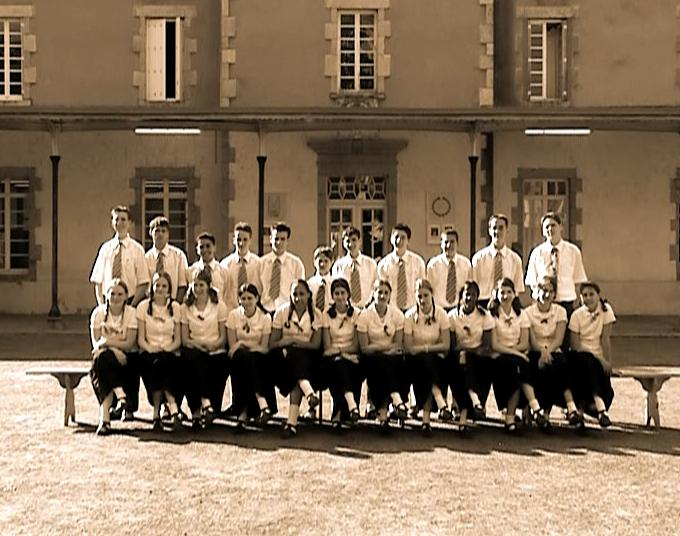
Pensionnat de Chavagnes participants in 2004, recreating a 1950s French school for French TV

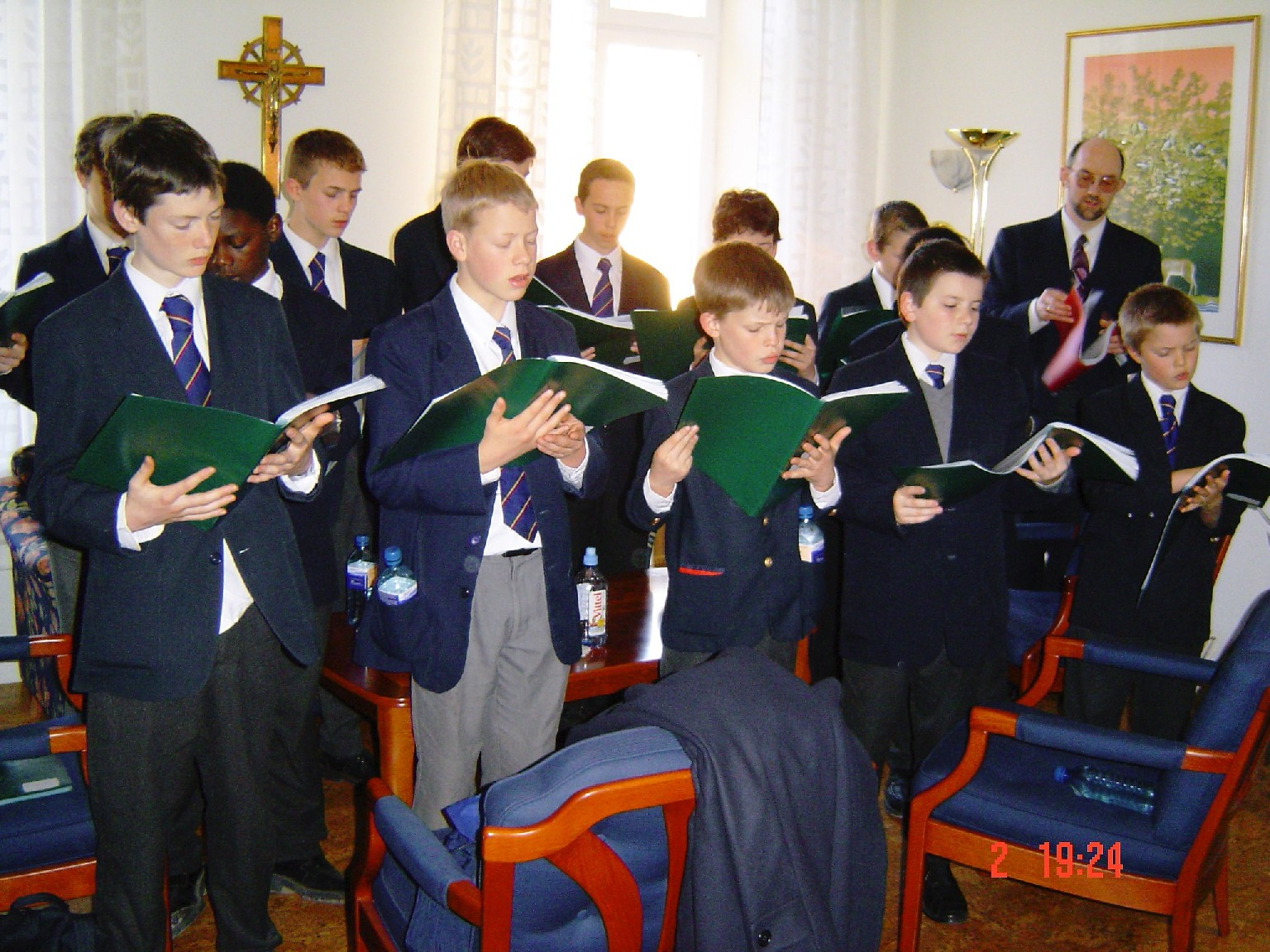
Choir

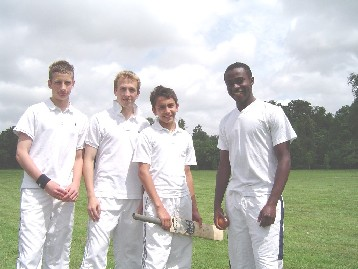
Cricket players from Chavagnes

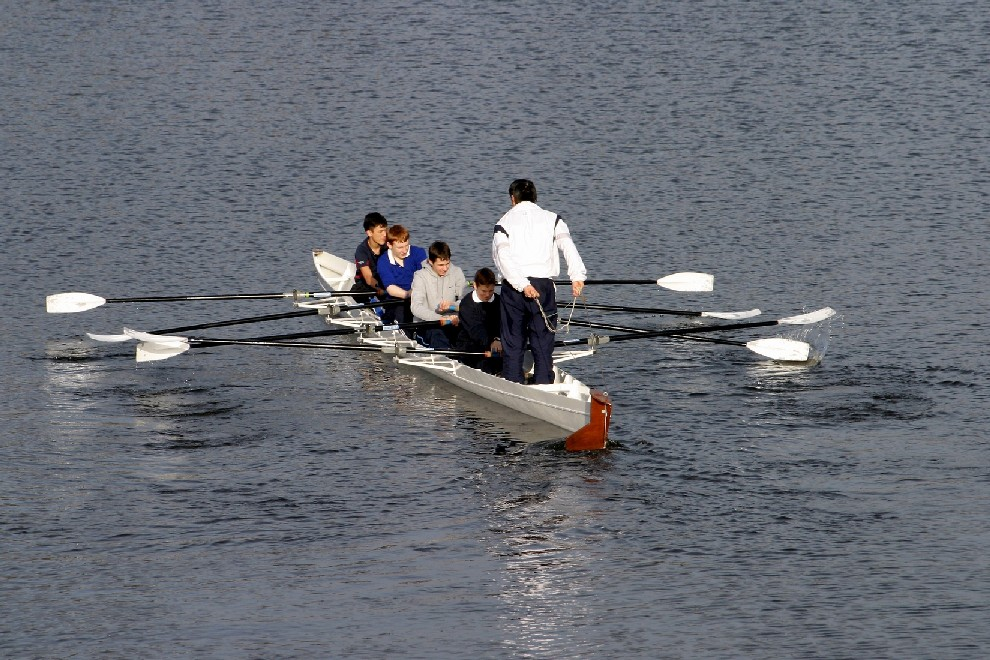
Chavagnes Rowing team

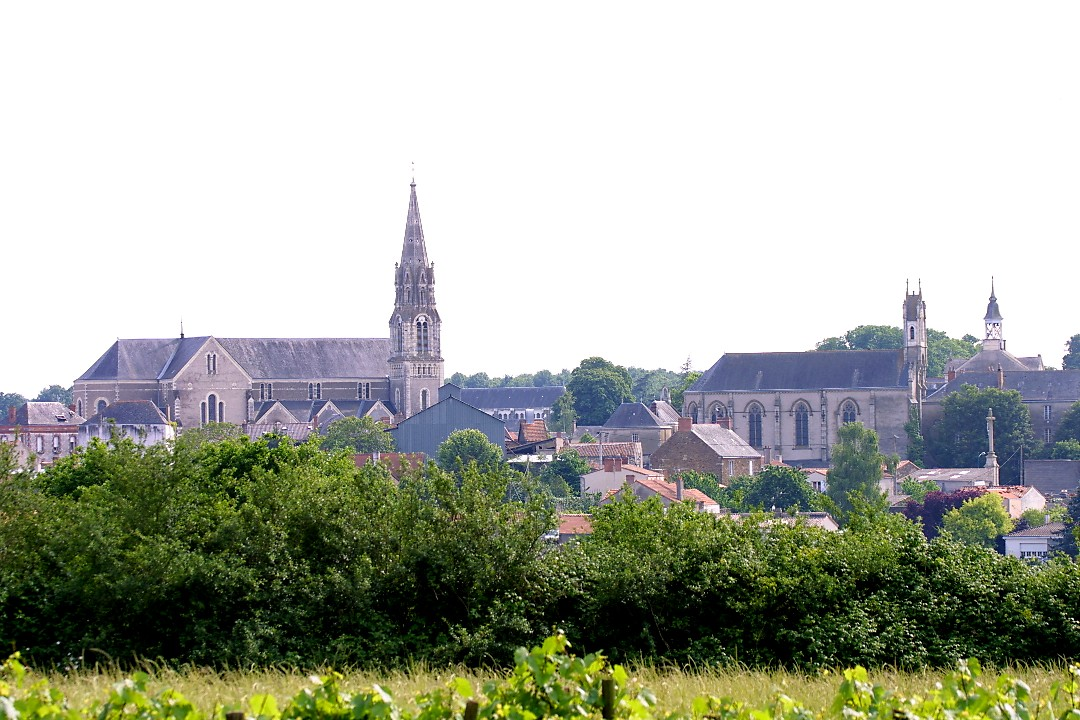
View of Chavagnes

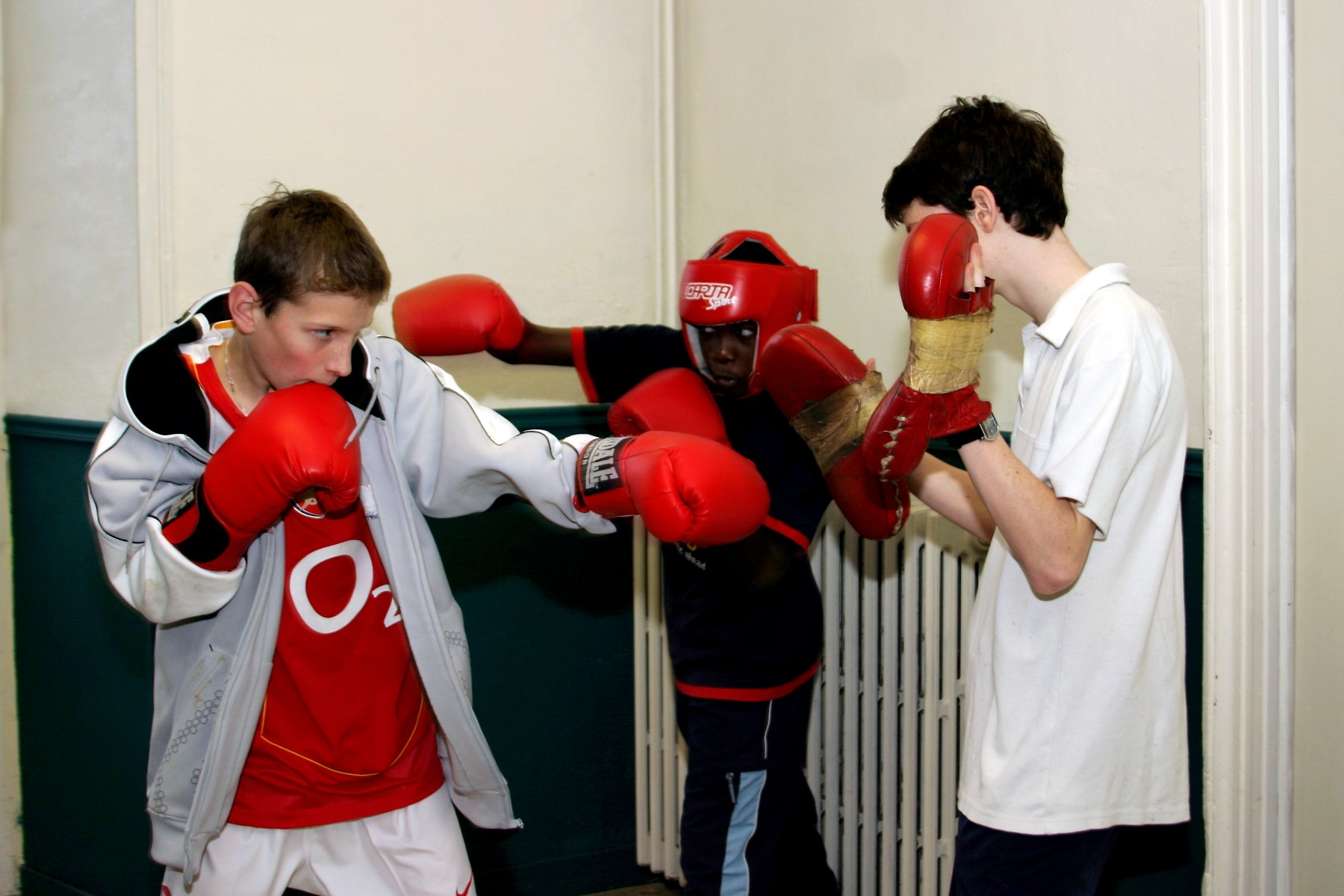
Boxing at Chavagnes

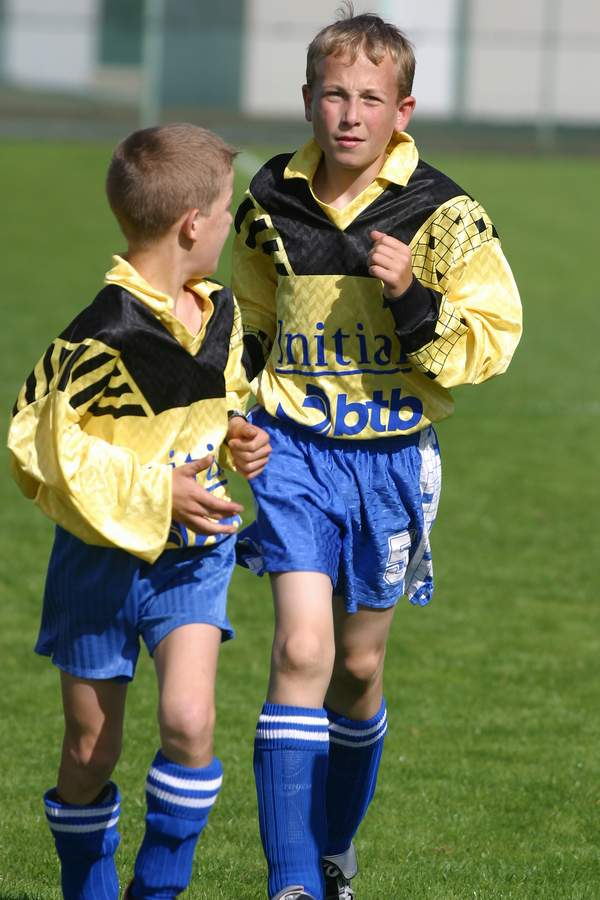
Football at Chavagnes

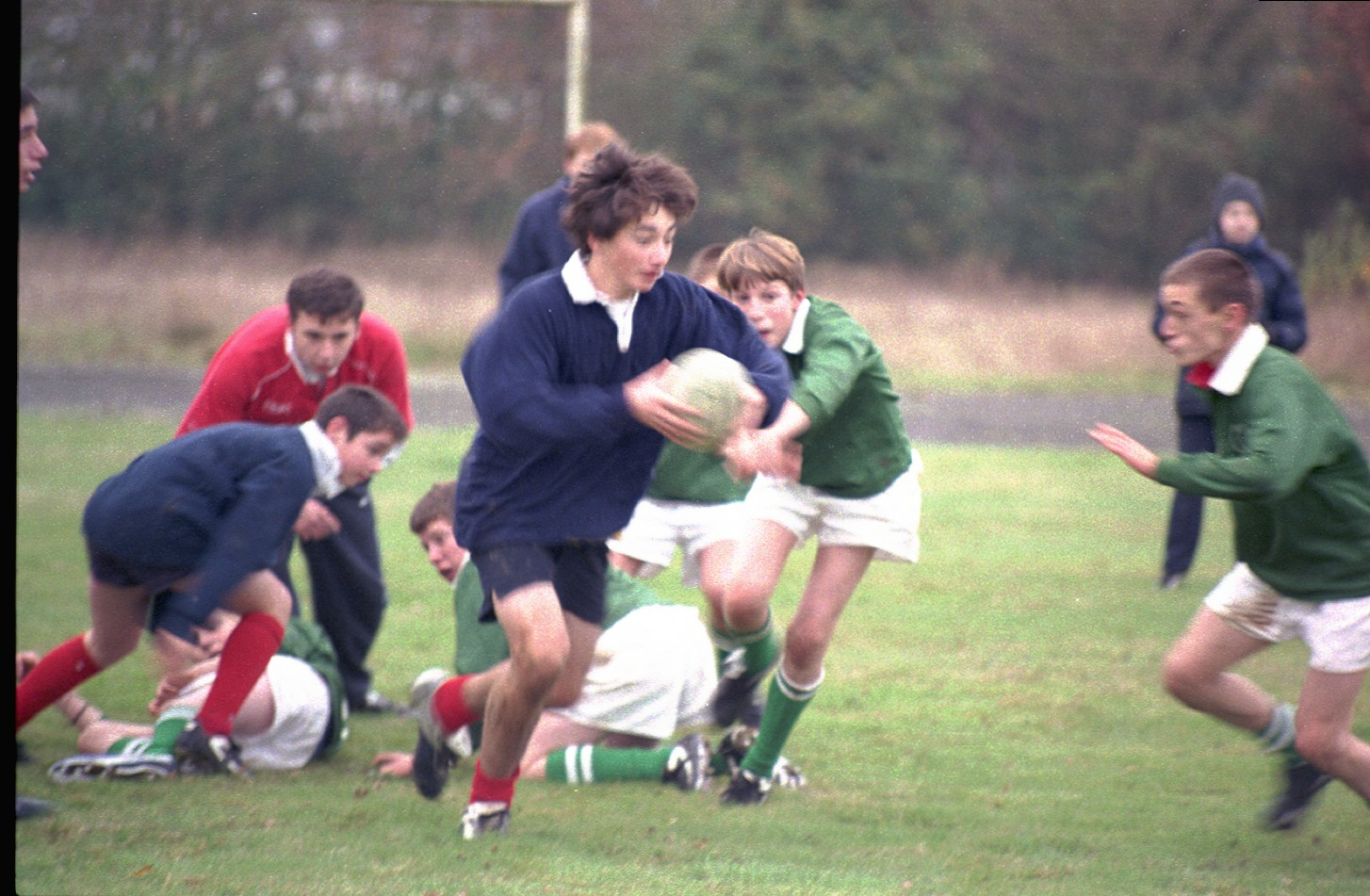
Chavagnes Rugby

== See also ==
- Education in France
- Catholic Church in France
- List of schools in France
