= Jean Léchelle =

- Born: 2 April 1760; Puyréaux, France
- Died: 11 November 1793 (aged 33) Nantes, Loire-Atlantique, France
- Allegiance: France
- Branch: Infantry
- Service years: (France) 1791–1793
- Rank: General of division
- Commands: Army of the West
- Conflicts: War of the First Coalition; Battle of Valmy; Battle of Jemappes; Siege of Valenciennes; Siege of Lyon; War in the Vendée; Battle of La Tremblaye; Second Battle of Cholet; Battle of Entrames; Virée de Galerne †

Jean Léchelle or Jean L'Échelle (French pronunciation: [ʒɑ̃ leʃɛl]; 2 April 1760 – 11 November 1793) briefly commanded a French army during the French Revolutionary Wars. Having served in the French Royal Army as a youth, the outbreak of the French Revolution found him employed as a fencing master. He was elected to lead a volunteer National Guard battalion which fought at Valmy and Jemappes in 1792. He earned promotion to general officer after distinguishing himself at the Siege of Valenciennes and saving a representative from an angry mob. He won such favor with the politicians and the war office that he was rapidly catapulted into command of an army in the War in the Vendée. After the capable battalion leader demonstrated his total unfitness for the post of army commander, he was just as quickly arrested and thrown into prison where he died, a probable suicide.

== Early life ==
Léchelle was born on 2 April 1760 at Puyréaux. As a young man he enlisted in the French Royal Army as a private and later became a fencing master at Saintes. When the French Revolution broke out he enrolled in the National Guard of Charente-Inférieure. In 1791 he became lieutenant colonel of the 1st Charente Battalion of volunteers. On 20 September 1792 the battalion fought at the Battle of Valmy as part of the Left Wing under Jean-Pierre François de Chazot. On 6 November that year the 1st Charente was at the Battle of Jemappes where it was included in François Richer Drouet's 1st Brigade of the First Line of the Left Wing under Jean Henri Becays Ferrand.

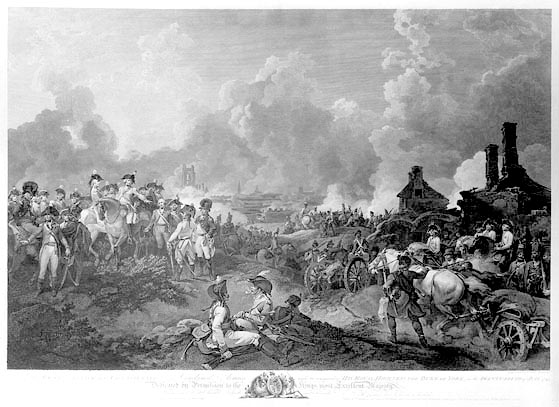
Siege of Valenciennes, 1793

The battalion formed part of the garrison during the Siege of Valenciennes which lasted from 25 May to 27 July 1793. The French defenders led by Jean Ferrand surrendered to the Coalition army under Prince Frederick, Duke of York and Albany after 1,000 soldiers were killed or died of sickness out of 9,800 troops. The survivors were released on the promise not to fight against the Coalition army for one year. As the French troops marched out of the city to lay down their arms they were set upon by the inhabitants of Valenciennes who then raised the Bourbon flag. Léchelle protected the representative Charles Cochon de Lapparent when the civilians threatened to do him harm, and Cochon secured his appointment as general of brigade on 17 August 1793. In any case, Léchelle earned the promotion by displaying courage and persistence during the defense of Valenciennes.

The War in the Vendée was an armed rebellion against the conscription of men for the army and against the National Convention's hostility toward priests. Led by the local nobility, the Vendeans soon proved to be a formidable foe. To deal with the threat, the French government formed three armies, the Army of the Coasts of La Rochelle from the Gironde to the mouth of the Loire River, the Army of the Coasts of Brest from the Loire to Saint-Malo and the Army of the Coasts of Cherbourg from Saint-Malo to the Authie River east of the Somme River. On 9 June 1793 the Vendeans drubbed Jacques-François Menou's division in the Battle of Saumur. Though Jean Baptiste Camille Canclaux defeated the rebels in the Battle of Nantes on 29 June, the Vendeans won the Battle of Vihiers on 18 July when a large part of the Republican forces simply ran away.

On 23 July 1793 the Prussian army successfully ended the Siege of Mainz. The Prussians thoughtlessly allowed the 16,000-man French garrison to go home on the condition not to fight against the Coalition for one year. Army of the Rhine commander Alexandre de Beauharnais suggested that using the garrison to fight in the Vendée would not be a violation of their parole. By 25 August the so-called Army of Mayence (the French name for Mainz) under Jean-Baptiste Annibal Aubert du Bayet assembled at Tours. Its 14,000 well-trained troops included Jean Baptiste Kléber newly promoted to general of brigade. The Austrians and English having made the same blunder as the Prussians, the 6,000 fit troops from the garrison of Valenciennes were sent first to the Siege of Lyon and later to the Vendée.

== Army command ==
=== La Tremblaye and Cholet ===
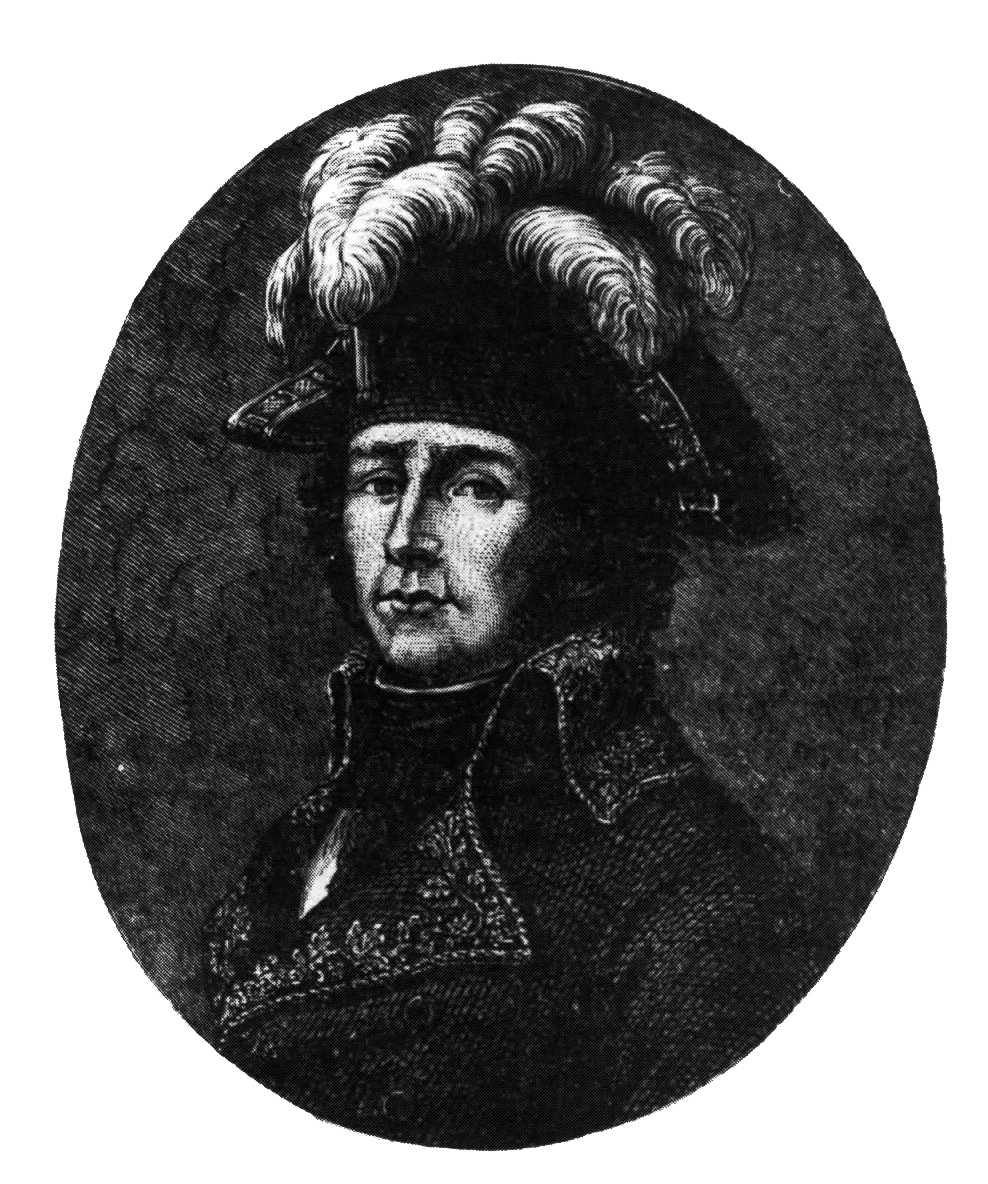
Léchelle proved to be worse than the inept Jean Antoine Rossignol.

In early October 1793, as the French were about to launch a new offensive, Canclaux was suspended from command of the Army of the Coasts of Brest and du Bayet was also removed from his post. The dismissals were brought about by the scheming of Charles-Philippe Ronsin who convinced the minister of war Jean Baptiste Noël Bouchotte that Canclaux and du Bayet were responsible for the lack of success. A protégé of Bouchotte, Léchelle was called to be commander-in-chief of the Army of the West on 30 September. He had been promoted to general of division at about the same time. The new army took over the troops of the Army of the Coasts of La Rochelle, which was formerly led by Jean Antoine Rossignol, plus the Army of Mayence. On 6 October Rossignol went to command the Army of the Coasts of Brest. Léchelle was officially in command from 6 October. He was with the La Rochelle division at first and Kléber served as the interim commander of the Nantes and Mayence divisions in his absence. Leaving the La Rochelle division in charge of Alexis Chalbos, Léchelle assumed command from Kléber on 9 October.

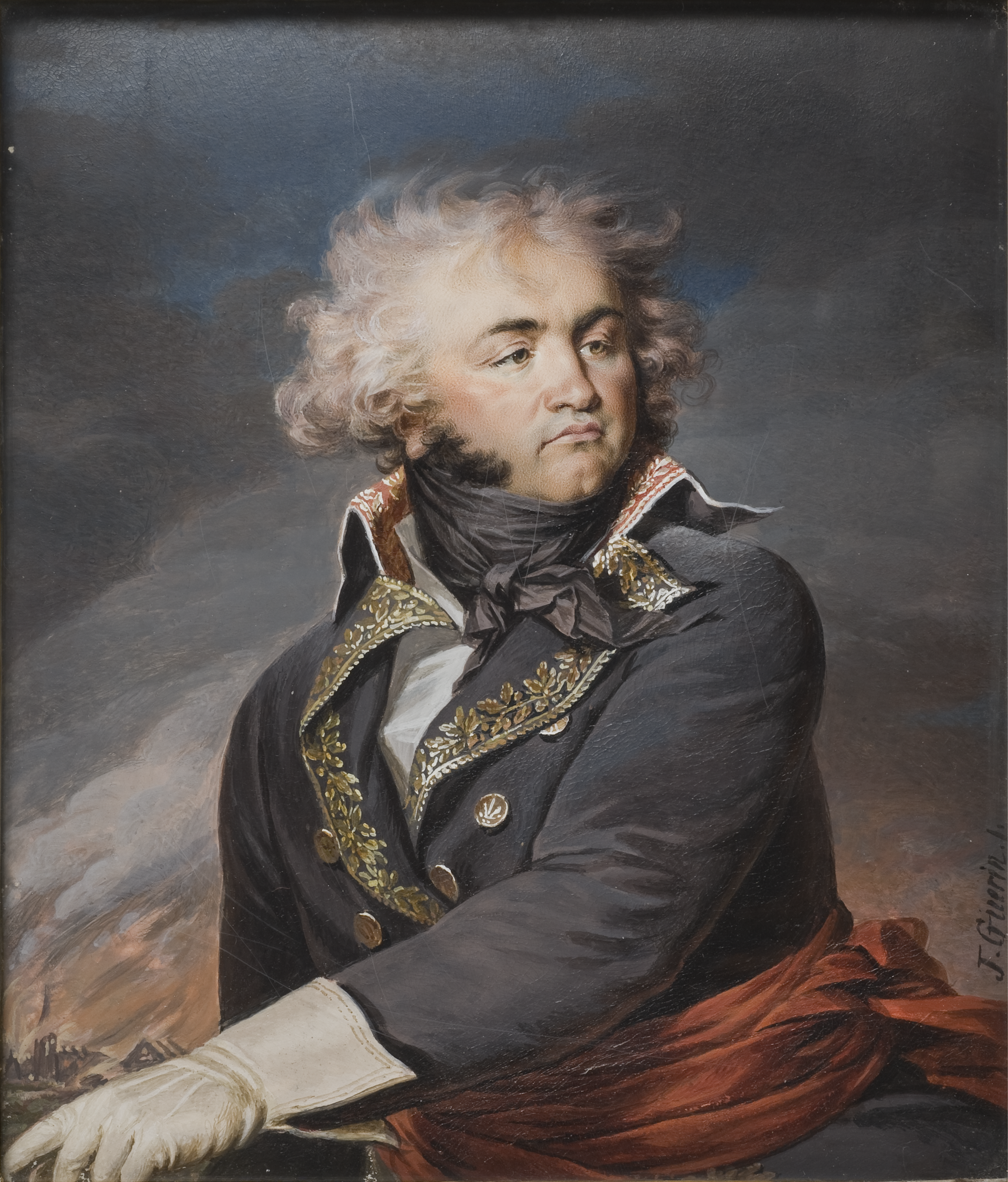
Jean Baptiste Kléber was a capable subordinate but also a harsh critic.

The Committee of Public Safety believed Léchelle combined "audacity with the necessary talents to end the war". Unfortunately, he turned out to be worse than Rossignol who, though brave, was generally understood to be incompetent. When Léchelle arrived at headquarters at Montaigu, Kléber placed a map in front of him and explained the strategy of his predecessor Canclaux. Without bothering to glance at the map, Léchelle replied, "On this terrain it is a question of display. One must march majestically and in mass". As Kléber quietly put away the map, the representative Antoine Merlin de Thionville declared that the government was appointing the most ignorant generals possible. After discussion, it was agreed that the Nantes and Mayence divisions would continue to march from the west toward Cholet where it would meet converging columns from Luçon and Les Sables d'Olonne in the south and from Bressuire in the east. After starting at La Châtaigneraie, Chalbos and François Joseph Westermann devastated the countryside as far as Bressuire where they were joined by columns from Saumur and Thouars, making a body of 20,000 soldiers.

On 14 October 1793, Léchelle ordered the Luçon column to march through Mortagne-sur-Sèvre to make contact with the advance guard of the Mayence division under Michel de Beaupuy. A blundering staff officer failed to notify Beaupuy of the intended junction and the Luçon division marched into a Vendean ambush. After its commander was hit, François Séverin Marceau-Desgraviers took charge of the column and fought off the Vendeans in the Battle of La Tremblaye on 15 October. Beaupuy marched to the guns and helped repulse the rebels whose leader Louis Marie de Lescure was badly wounded.

The Vendean army evacuated Cholet the following day and it was occupied by 22,000 Republicans with 30 guns. Kléber deployed the troops of Beaupuy and Nicolas Haxo on the left, the Luçon division in the center under Marceau and Louis Antoine Vimieux's men on the right. During the early hours of the morning, 9,000 troops under Chalbos and François Muller arrived from the east. On 17 October 41,000 Vendeans attacked in the Second Battle of Cholet. Charles de Bonchamps and Maurice d'Elbée assaulted the center with 14,000 rebels while Henri de La Rochejaquelein and Jean-Nicolas Stofflet attacked the flanks. Beaupuy's division was driven back and 12 guns were lost, but Marceau and Vimieux both held their ground against desperate assaults. No sooner did Muller's 4,000-man division appear on the field than it panicked and fled. Finally, the reserve helped Beaupuy's division defeat the Vendeans in front of him. The Vendeans mounted a last gasp assault which failed and Bonchamps and Elbée were both shot down. The defeated army retreated north to Beaupréau that evening. Though Léchelle was nominally in command, Kléber wrote the battle dispatch. The Republicans suffered 4,000 killed and wounded while the Vendeans sustained 8,000 casualties.

=== Entrames ===
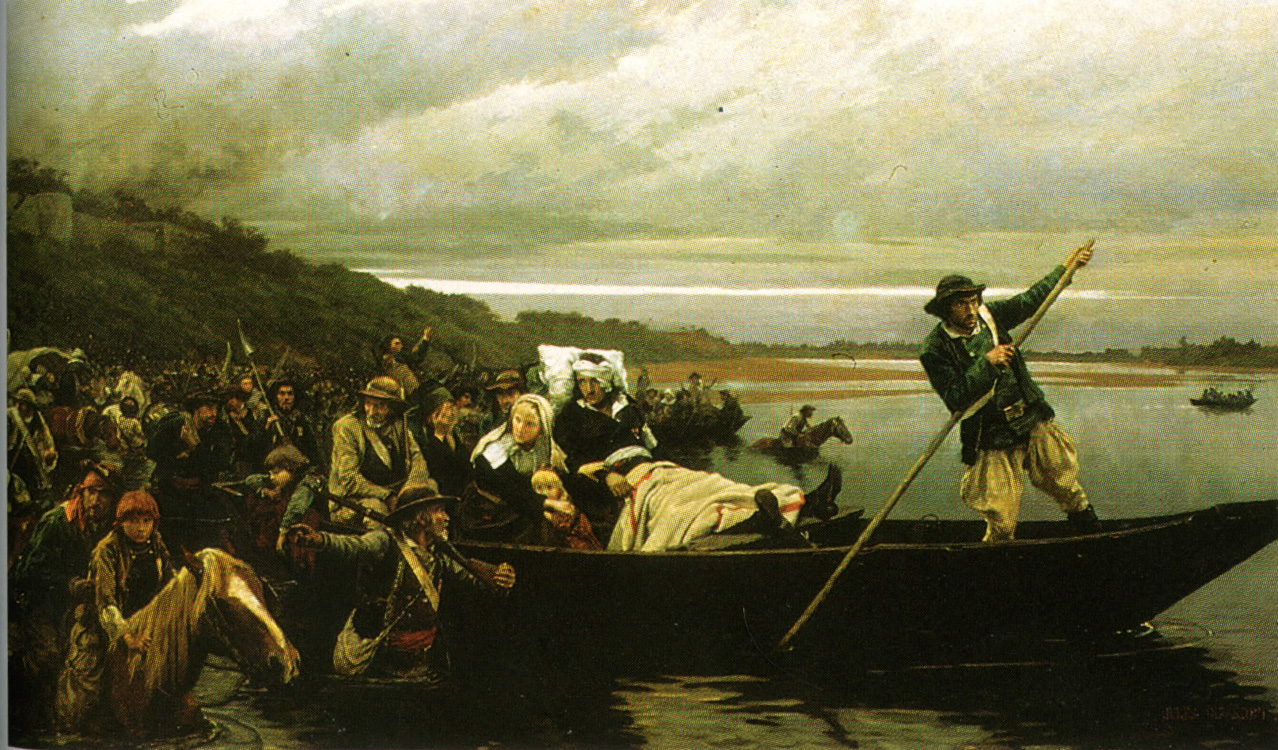
The Vendeans crossed the Loire at Saint-Florent.

While Westermann's cavalry plundered Beaupréau, the Vendean army slipped away to Saint-Florent-le-Vieil on the Loire. The next day the Vendean army crossed to the north side of the river, avoiding Westermann who arrived too late and expended his fury by devastating the area. The responsibility for escape of the rebel army was due to Léchelle's failure to push the pursuit but also to 10,000 Republican troops north of the Loire that failed to block the crossing. Léchelle took Marceau, newly promoted to general of brigade, as his chief of staff after Cholet. Kléber was also promoted to general of division. The move of Vendeans north of the Loire was inspired by the hope that they might capture a port and contact the British fleet. The rebel army, now under La Rochejaquelein, numbered about 30,000 combatants and 20,000 women and children. Stopping at Laval the Vendeans hoped that Bretons would flock to their banners but few joined.

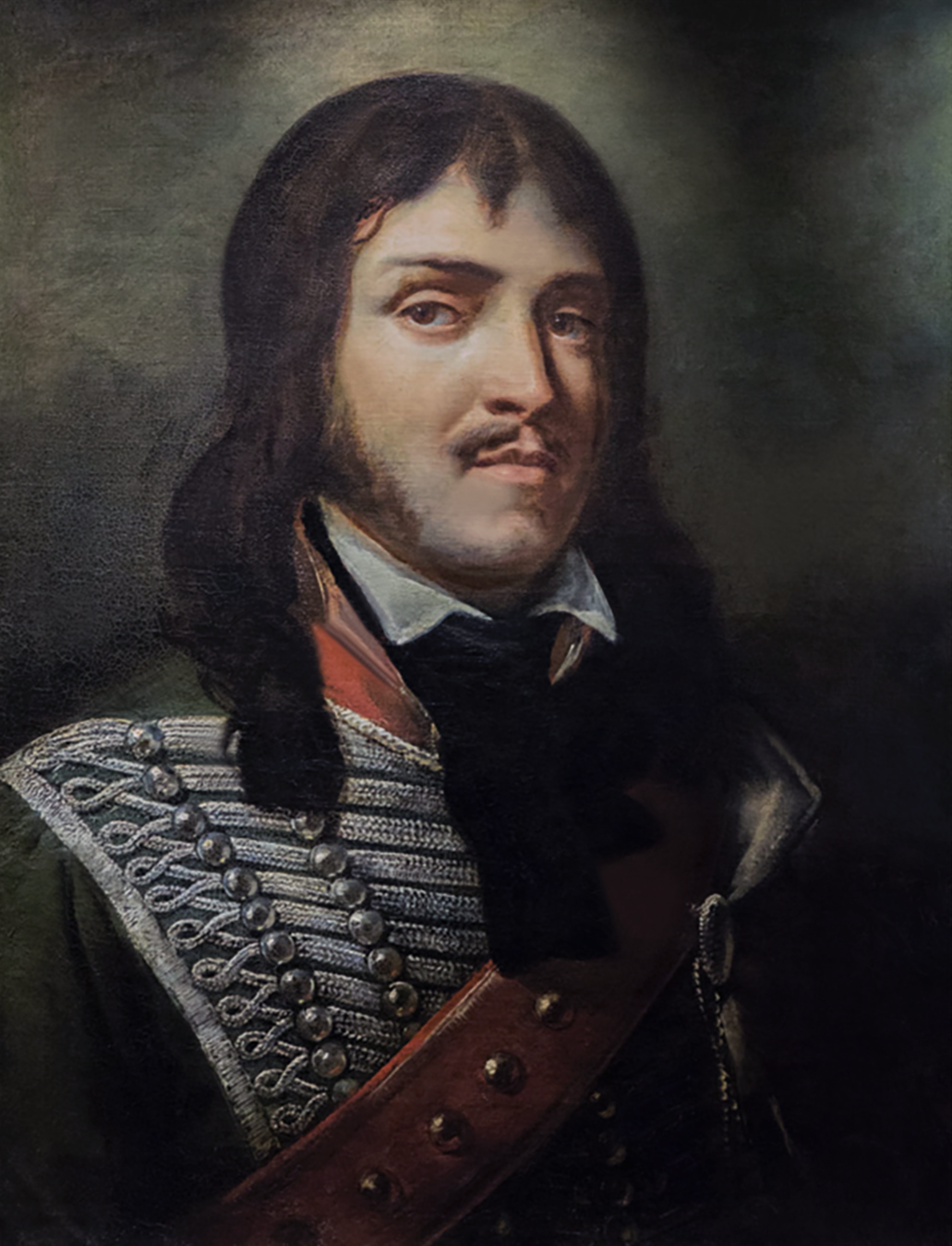
Chief of staff François Marceau's advice was ignored by Léchelle.

After the Army of the West crossed to the north bank of the Loire, Kléber and Marceau advised moving in several columns but Léchelle overruled them, insisting that the army move in a single column. Kléber was incredulous, writing that, "it seemed most extraordinary to us, but we had to obey". On the evening of 25 October the reckless Westermann blundered into an ambush at Croix-de-Bataille south of Laval and fell back to a fine defensive position at Entrammes. On 26 October Léchelle and main body of the 25,000-strong army reached Château-Gontier. He ordered Westermann to retreat from his position and Kléber to continue marching to Villiers-Charlemagne. Kléber and Marceau recommended that the army halt at Château-Gontier while they devised a two-pronged attack along both banks of the Mayenne River. Urged on by the representatives on mission, Léchelle and the council of war insisted on making contact with the rebels the next day.

The Battle of Entrames started at 11:00 am on 28 October 1793 when Beaupuy's division accompanied by Marceau encountered the Vendeans on the heights of Entrammes. Kléber brought his division up in support of Beaupuy who had come under assault. Unfortunately, Léchelle had jammed the entire army into a single column in which the rear was unable to come to the assistance of the vanguard, nor could the army commander issue the orders required to remedy the situation. Though they were facing the army's best troops, the Vendeans mounted an extremely effective attack which steadily drove back the Republicans. Finally, seeing the rear of the column start to disintegrate, the divisions of Kléber and Beaupuy took to their heels. That evening the Republicans tried to hold Château-Gontier, but the rebels drove them from there. Troops from the Army of the West scattered as far as Nantes, Angers and Rennes. One source placed Republican losses as 12,000 men and 19 artillery pieces out of 30,000. A more modest estimate is 4,000 Republican casualties out of 25,000 against 2,100 Vendeans killed and wounded out of 31,000. As his soldiers fled, Léchelle shouted, "What have I done that I should command such cowards?" A soldier responded, "What have we done that we should be commanded by such a shit?"

On 28 October Kléber and Marceau could only scrape together 7,000 soldiers at Le Lion-d'Angers. When Léchelle tried to inspect the troops with Kléber he was met with cries of, "Down with Léchelle! Long live du Bayet! Why don't you leave us? Long live Kléber!" The brutal Westermann announced, "No, I shall not obey a coward!" There are several stories of what happened next. In one account, the representatives got Léchelle to resign for reasons of sickness and, "he played the invalid so well that he soon died". In a second account, Merlin de Thionville had him arrested and brought to Nantes, where he died in prison from poison or despair. The final account stated that he was so ashamed that he went to Nantes and committed suicide. He died on 11 November 1793. Chalbos took command of the Army of the West on 28 October.

== Commentary ==
Writer Louis Gabriel Michaud described Léchelle as, "without education and totally devoid of the talent for command". Kléber wrote that Léchelle was, "the most cowardly of soldiers, the worst of officers, and the most ignorant leader ever seen. He did not understand maps, hardly knew how to sign his name, and did not once approach within cannon shot of the rebels; in a word, there was nothing comparable to his poltroonery and his inefficiency, except his arrogance, his brutality, and his obstinacy". Marceau's biographer Thomas George Johnson called Léchelle, "pompous and inexperienced".

== Notes ==
Military offices
| Preceded by New organization | Commander-in-chief of the Army of the West; 6–27 October 1793 | Succeeded by Alexis Chalbos |
