= Battle of Dol =

Succession of battles in the war in the Vendée

Coordinates: 48.5506°N 1.7497°W

Battle of Fougères
- Part of the War in the Vendée
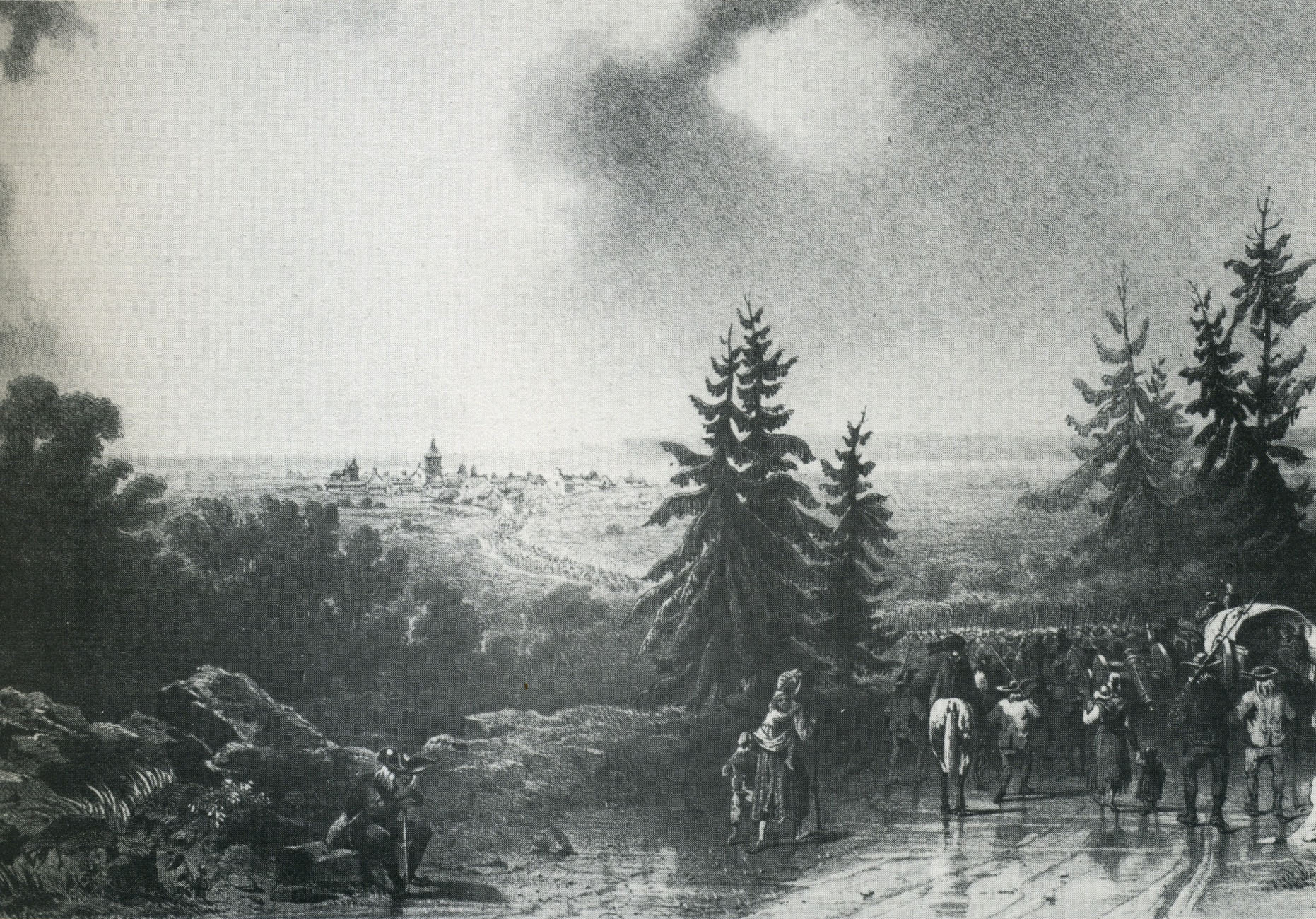
- Vendée Army marching towards Antrain
Date	20–22 November 1793
Location	Dol-de-Bretagne, Pontorson and Antrain
Result	Vendéen victory

Belligerents
(France) Republicans	(Kingdom of France) Vendéens (Kingdom of France) Chouans

Commanders and leaders
• Jean Antoine Rossignol • Jean-Baptiste Kléber • François Marceau • Westermann • François Muller • Jean Boüin de Marigny • Jean-Pierre Boucret • François Pierre Amey	• Rochejaquelein • Jean-Nicolas Stofflet • Trémoille de Talmont • Henri Forestier • Gaspard de Marigny • Fleuriot de La Freulière • François Lyrot • Charles de Royrand

Strength
20,000 men	30,000 men 50 cannons

Casualties and losses
Very high Several thousands	900 casualties

The Battle of Dol was a succession of battles in the war in the Vendée. They lasted three days and two nights from 20 to 22 November 1793 around Dol-de-Bretagne, Pontorson and Antrain.
The Vendéens repelled an offensive by the Republicans against the town of Dol-de-Bretagne, then counterattacked and stormed Antrain, where the patriots' headquarters were located. The Republican forces suffered one of their heaviest defeats of the conflict and retreated to Rennes.

== Prelude ==
After its defeat at the Battle of Entrames on 26 October 1793, the Republican Army of the West spent several days in Angers to reorganize. General-in-chief Jean Léchelle is replaced by General Jean Antoine Rossignol after a brief interim period provided by Alexis Chalbos. By order of the Committee of Public Safety, the Army of Mainz was suppressed and its troops were absorbed into the Army of the West. After several days of reorganization carried out mainly by Kléber, the army could count on 16,000 men.

On 15 November, the Western Army joined up with the Army of the Coasts of Brest at Rennes. Meanwhile, a column of 4,000 men from Brest and commanded by General Auguste Joseph Tribout arrived in Dinan on 14 November, then moved to Pontorson. Another column of 6,000 men from the Army of the Coasts of Cherbourg, led by Charles Guillaume Sepher, left Caen and headed towards Avranches.

For their part, the Vendéens failed to take the port of Granville on 14 and 15 November and they retreated in disorder to Avranches.

On 17 November, the Republicans took up position: the troops of Kléber, Muller, Boucret and Amey held Antrain, those of Bouin de Marigny occupied Saint-Ouen-la-Rouërie and Montanel and those of Marceau occupied Tremblay.

On 18 November, the troops of Canuel and Amey were sent to occupy Fougères. They encountered no resistance but massacred the wounded and sick Vendéens left in the city's hospitals. The same day, part of the Vendée army left Avranches and crushed Tribout's troops at Pontorson. The surviving Republicans retreated to Dinan. The next day, the Vendée forces remaining at Avranches joined the advance guard of the army at Pontorson. On the 20th, the Vendéens set out for Dol-de-Bretagne.

Kléber then presented his plan which was approved by the Représentants en mission Pierre Bourbotte, Pierre Louis Prieur and Louis Turreau. He planned an attack on Dol-de-Bretagne with four columns from Antrain, while Westermann and Bouin de Marigny, each at the head of a body of 3,000 men of cavalry and light infantry, were to attack the Vendéens on their flanks, the first from Pontorson and the second from Dinan.

== The Battle ==
On 20 November, Westermann advanced, recaptured Pontorson and massacred the wounded Vendeans remaining in the town, then he set out in pursuit of the stragglers on the road to Dol. On 21 November, around 1 or 2 a.m., Westermann and Bouin de Marigny prematurely launched the attack on Dol-de-Bretagne, without respecting Kléber's plan. For his part, François Séverin Marceau marched on Dol from Antrain with the vanguard of the army. Rossignol remained in reserve behind him with 10,000 men.

The Vendée army then divided in two: La Rochejaquelein led the counterattack against Westermann on the Pontorson road, to the northeast, while Jean-Nicolas Stofflet went to meet Marceau on the Antrain road, to the southeast.

The meeting between Stofflet and Marceau took place at 4 a.m.15. The Republicans initially had the advantage and part of the Vendée forces fled to Dol. However, the women and priests who remained inside the city rallied the fugitives to return to fight.

Marceau did not take advantage of the disorder in the Vendée ranks, because of the night and a thick fog which masked their rout. He received as reinforcement the division of General François Muller, but the latter was drunk and was unable to assume his command. At daybreak, Kléber and Rossignol arrived in turn with the bulk of the army, but they found the battalions already engaged in complete disorder.

For his part, La Rochejaquelein pushed Westermann back onto Pontorson, then he moved towards the Antrain road to come to the aid of Stofflet. A few hours later, he attacked the Republicans on their right flank. Kléber and Rossignol then gave the order for retreat and the army fell back on Antrain. The fighting stopped for a few hours and some exhausted fighters fell asleep in the fields.

Stofflet, however, gathered his troops and launched an assault on Antrain in the evening. The town was taken by storm and the Republicans fled to Rennes.

The Vendéens took many prisoners, and they summarily shot part of them after learning of the massacre of their wounded at Fougères. La Rochejaquelein, however, managed to prevent the massacre of 150 wounded Republicans being treated in the Antrain church.

== Losses ==
The losses are not known with precision. At the beginning of the 19th century, the author Pierre-Victor Berthre de Bourniseaux estimated the number of Republicans killed or wounded at 12,000, and Abbot Félix Deniau at nearly 10,000 to 12,000. These two Royalist authors also put the Vendée losses at 900.
