= Army of the West (France) =

- Active: 2 October 1793 – 6 January 1796; 17 January 1800 – 21 May 1802
- Country: (France) First French Republic
- Branch: Army
- Type: Army
- Size: Several divisions
- Engagements: War in the Vendée; Second Battle of Châtillon (1793); First Battle of Noirmoutier (1793); Battle of La Tremblaye (1793); Battle of Cholet (1793); Battle of Laval (1793); Battle of Entrames (1793); Battle of Fougères (1793); Battle of Granville (1793); Battle of Dol (1793); Siege of Angers (1793); Battle of Le Mans (1793); Battle of Savenay (1793)

Commanders
- Notable commanders: François Séverin Marceau; Louis Marie Turreau; Thomas-Alexandre Dumas; Jean Baptiste Canclaux; Lazare Hoche; Guillaume Brune; Jean Baptiste Bernadotte

The Army of the West (armée de l'Ouest) was one of the French Revolutionary Armies that was sent to fight in the War in the Vendée in western France. The army was created on 2 October 1793 by merging the Army of the Coasts of La Rochelle, the so-called Army of Mayence and part of the Army of the Coasts of Brest. In 1793 the army or its component forces fought at Second Châtillon, First Noirmoutier, La Tremblaye, Cholet, Laval, Entrames, Fougères, Granville, Dol, Angers, Le Mans and Savenay. After the main Vendean army was crushed, the revolt evolved into guerrilla warfare and there were few pitched battles. In 1794 Louis Marie Turreau tried to suppress the rebellion with extremely brutal methods using the infamous infernal columns. Calmer heads finally prevailed and Turreau was recalled. On 6 January 1796, the army was absorbed into the newly formed Army of the Coasts of the Ocean. The Army of the West came into existence a second time on 17 January 1800 and was finally suppressed on 21 May 1802.

== History ==
=== Background ===
The two chief causes of the War in the Vendée were the attempt by the French National Convention to impose conscription on the population and to force the Civil Constitution of the Clergy on the priests. The great majority of the priests in the Vendée refused to take the oath and most of the population resented sending their young men to war. By April 1793 the region was in full rebellion led by the country gentry. Since much of the area was covered by woods or hedges and traversed by narrow lanes, it proved to be ideal terrain for the local people to launch ambushes and sudden attacks against the Republican French troops. If the Vendeans were driven off, they would quickly disappear to their homes using secret byways. To a casual observer they would appear to be peaceful farmers. Soon the rebels armed themselves with weapons and ammunition captured from the French Republican forces. Two groups that often supported the Republican government were residents of the larger towns and Protestants.

Because Revolutionary France was ringed with enemies, very few regular battalions could be spared to fight in the War in the Vendée. At first, local battalions were used, but these men were frightened of the rebels. The French government scraped up more volunteers to send to the Vendée. The 35th Legion of Gendarmes proved to be an effective unit. The German Legion, made up of German and Swiss deserters, fought capably but many promptly deserted to the Vendeans. From the Army of the North and the Army of the Ardennes the government ordered each infantry company to send six men to the Vendée. The battalions formed from these men had poor cohesion. The worst soldiers were the 12 battalions of the Paris National Guard under Antoine Joseph Santerre. Time and again, these undisciplined men fled at the mere sight of their enemies.

After a period of confusion, three armies were formed on 1 May 1793. The Army of the Coasts of Cherbourg covered the area from Saint-Malo east to the Authie River. The Army of the Coasts of Brest guarded the region from Saint-Malo south to the mouth of the Loire River. The Army of the Coasts of La Rochelle was responsible for the lands from the Loire south to the Gironde estuary. In early June, the Vendeans routed a major French Republican force in the Battle of Saumur and captured 46 guns. This was followed by another disaster on 18 July at the Battle of Vihiers when 12,000 rebels smashed a 14,000-man Republican force, inflicting losses of 5,000 men and taking 25 of its 30 guns.

On 23 July, the Siege of Mainz ended in a French surrender. The Prussians carelessly paroled the garrison on the promise not to fight against the Coalition armies for one year. It was noted that the terms did not prevent the troops from being used to fight the Vendeans, so the parolees were hurried west. These 14,000 well-disciplined soldiers became the unofficially named Army of Mayence under Jean-Baptiste Annibal Aubert du Bayet. They were soon fighting with the Army of the Coasts of Brest under Jean Baptiste Camille Canclaux near Nantes. The Army of the Coasts of La Rochelle was assigned to the incompetent Jean Antoine Rossignol who was protected from criticism because of his Jacobin political views. The strategy adopted by the Republican armies was to attack the Vendée with converging columns.

The month of September 1793 saw Canclaux repulse a Vendean attack on Nantes and then try to advance into the heart of the Vendée. His efforts were foiled by strong Vendean resistance and because Rossignol failed to fully carry out his part of the plan. Suddenly on 7 October, Canclaux and du Bayet were summarily removed from command. Rossignol was transferred to command the Army of the Coasts of Brest. The intriguer Charles-Philippe Ronsin brought about the change by persuading Minister of War Jean Baptiste Noël Bouchotte that Canclaux and du Bayet caused the recent defeats. The decision to transfer Rossignol also seemed to show that Ronsin and Bouchotte's confidence in that general was waning.

=== Creation ===
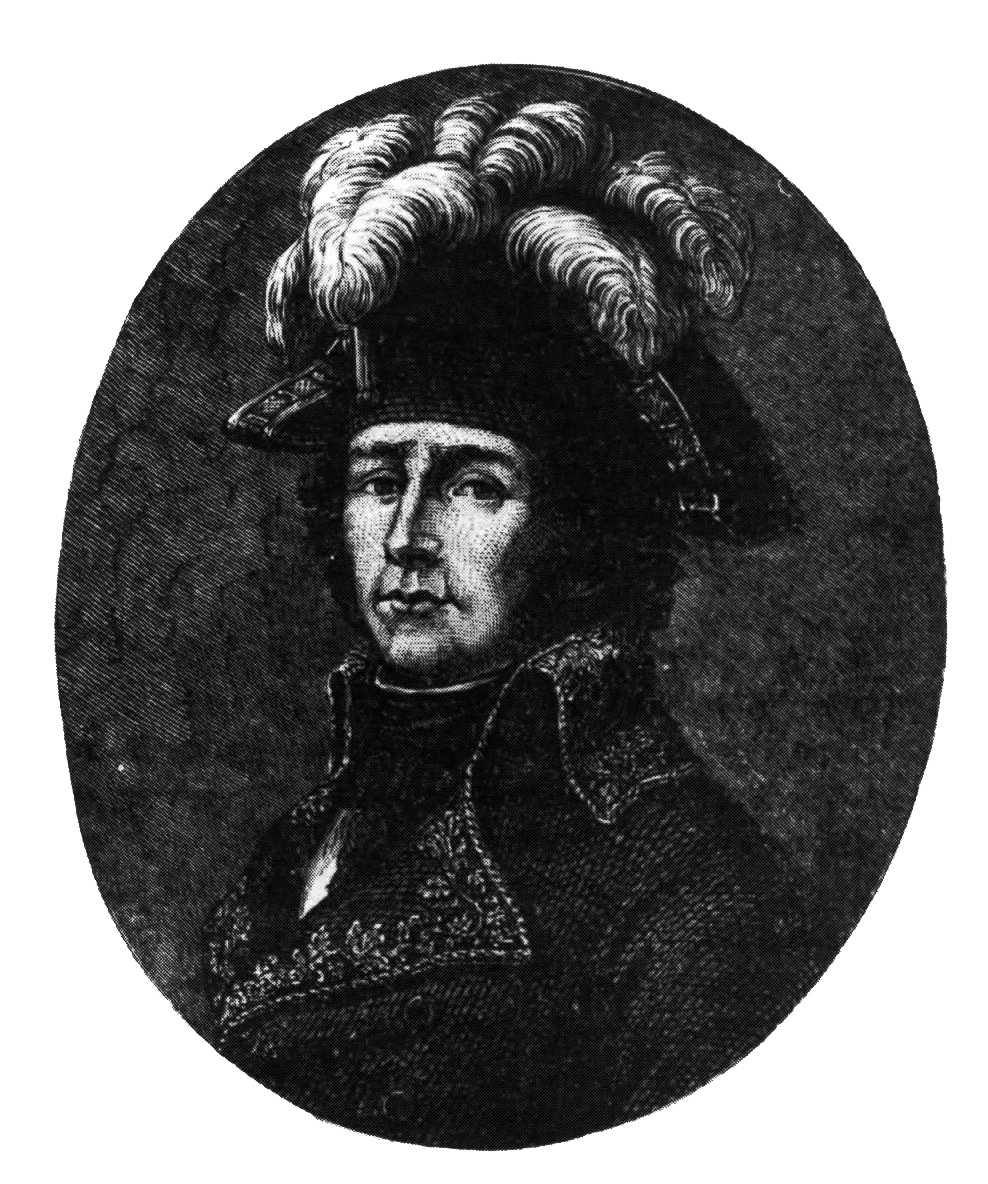
Jean Rossignol was understood to be inept.

By a decree of 2 October 1793, the Army of the West was created by combining the former Army of the Coasts of La Rochelle, the Army of Mayence and that part of the Army of the Coasts of Brest operating in the department of Loire-Inferieure. The decree was put into effect on 6 October when Jean Léchelle assumed command. Jean Baptiste Kléber remained in charge of the Army of Mayence until 8 October, while Alexis Chalbos was in temporary control of the eastern part of the army until 17 October. The Committee of Public Safety believed Léchelle to be the perfect candidate to put down the Vendean rebellion, but he proved to be a worse general than Rossignol. Kléber later described Léchelle as, "the most cowardly of soldiers, the worst of officers, and the most ignorant leader ever seen. He did not understand maps, hardly knew how to sign his name, and did not once approach within cannon shot of the rebels; in a word, there was nothing comparable to his poltroonery and his inefficiency, except his arrogance, his brutality, and his obstinacy".

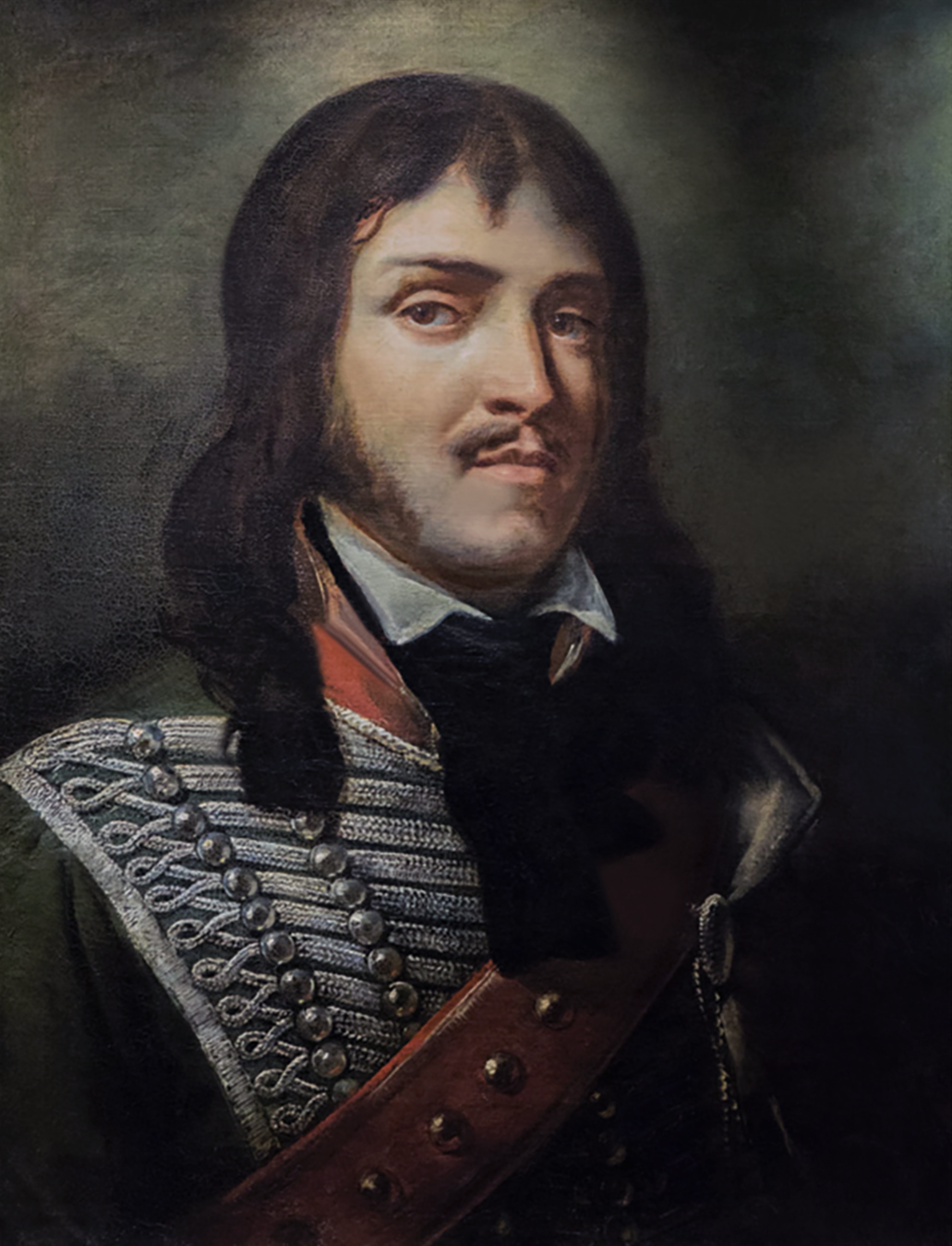
François Marceau won two important victories.

Soon there was a significant success. On 17 October 1793 at the Battle of Cholet, 25,000 Republicans defeated 40,000 rebels, inflicting losses of 8,000 while sustaining 4,000 casualties. Another account stated that there were 41,000 Vendeans against 31,000 Republicans and 30 guns. Louis Antoine Vimeux commanded the Republican right flank, François Séverin Marceau-Desgraviers the center, Michel de Beaupuy the left flank and Kléber the reserve. At this point, the Vendean army crossed to the north bank of the Loire, hoping to capture a port and make contact with the British Royal Navy. When Léchelle's army followed, the Vendeans lashed out at it.

At the Battle of Entrames on 27 October, 31,000 Vendeans defeated 25,000 Republicans, inflicting 4,000 casualties. Against the advice of Kléber and Marceau, Léchelle insisted on keeping the army in a single column and attacking immediately. While Kléber, Marceau and Beaupuy were with the front line units, Léchelle stayed in rear and was unable to send help. The Army of the West was routed and scattered in all directions. As the men fled, the hapless Léchelle called out, "What have I done that I should command such cowards?" A soldier shouted back, "What have we done that we should be commanded by such a shit?" At the next army inspection the soldiers yelled, "Down with Léchelle! Long live du Bayet! Long live Kléber!" In despair, Léchelle resigned his command, retired to Nantes and killed himself.

In the crisis, the Army of the North was ordered to send 10,000 reinforcements to put down the rebellion; these arrived in December. Since the Army of the West was in the territory of the Army of the Coasts of Brest, Rossignol assumed command. However, the generals and the representatives-on-mission did not want the inept Rossignol to lead the troops, so they appointed Marceau the commander-in-chief with Kléber as his deputy. Since Marceau was only 24 years old, Louis Marie Turreau was summoned from the Army of the Eastern Pyrenees to take over. Rossignol was supposed to have overall control of all the armies, but everyone seems to have ignored him. The Vendean army was crushed with terrible losses at the Battle of Le Mans on 12–13 December and at the Battle of Savenay on 23 December. The new commander Turreau did not replace Marceau until 30 December.

=== Infernal columns ===
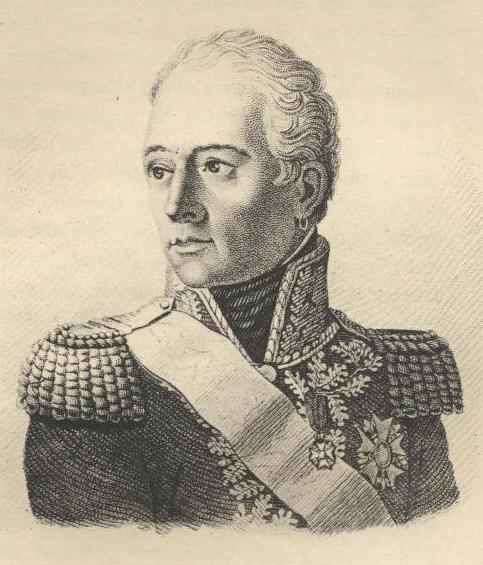
Louis Turreau

Kléber believed that he could end the rebellion, but Turreau brushed his ideas aside. Instead, Turreau embarked on a bloody program starting on 24 January 1794. With 80,000 soldiers, he ordered 12 "infernal columns" to sweep the Vendée, taking away all crops, burning farms and killing all suspected rebels. Not even women and children were spared from massacre. Turreau was encouraged in his horrible work by politicians such as Jean-Baptiste Carrier who said, "The women of La Vendée, it is from them that the race of enemies is reborn. The children, they are vipers to be crushed", and, "We will make a cemetery of France". Disgusted with Turreau's "diabolical plan", Marceau left for the Army of the Ardennes in January 1794 and Kléber got a transfer to the Army of the North in April.

The Vendean rebellion, which showed signs of quieting down, flared up again thanks to Turreau's harsh measures. The soldiers of the infernal columns interpreted their orders so loosely that many pro-Republicans were slaughtered along with the rebels. On 13 May, the Committee of Public Safety ordered Turreau to be suspended and sent to command an obscure post. Turreau was replaced by Vimeux. The army counted 103,812 soldiers in April 1794, but only 50,000 were capable of taking the field. Of these, 3,000 men were sent to the Army of the Western Pyrenees and 15,000 to the armies on the Rhine. On 16 August, a new order assigned the army command to Thomas-Alexandre Dumas. At that time, its strength was 45,000 men.

Turreau was arrested after the fall of Robespierre, but he convinced a court-martial that he was only following orders and was acquitted. He commanded troops under the First French Empire and, astonishingly, was in favor with the Bourbon Restoration when he died in 1816. Rossignol fell afoul of Napoleon and was exiled to the Seychelles where he died in 1802. Ronsin was guillotined during the Reign of Terror. Marceau was mortally wounded at Altenkirchen during the Battle of Limburg and died on 20 September 1796.

=== Pacification ===
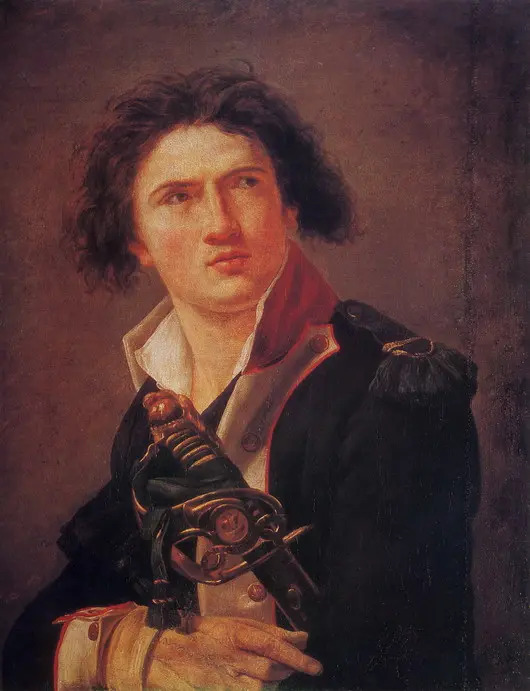
Lazare Hoche

In October 1794, Dumas was replaced in command of the Army of the West by Canclaux, who took Emmanuel de Grouchy as his chief of staff. On 17 February 1795 a pacification was signed by the political representatives of the warring sides. The Vendeans were allowed complete freedom of worship and were free from conscription for several years. In return, they recognized the First French Republic. The peace did not last long. Revolt broke out in the Vendée on 24 June under the leadership of François de Charette. At this time Canclaux was ill so Grouchy was the acting commander. Grouchy first moved against a threatened invasion and then sent reinforcements to the Army of the Coasts of Brest which was then under the command of Lazare Hoche. On 21 July 1795 at Quiberon, Hoche smashed an attempted invasion of France by Royalists landed by the British fleet.

In August 1795, the Army of the West numbered 27,000–28,000 men after being reinforced from the Army of the North. Grouchy was opposed by Charette with 8,000–12,000-foot and 900 horsemen. On 22 August, there was a conference at Nantes between two representatives, Hoche, du Bayet, Grouchy and Canclaux, who was still sick. It was decided that the three armies must act together against the insurgents. Canclaux was sent to Paris with the plan while Grouchy temporarily filled his place. The French government appointed Hoche as commander-in-chief of the Army of the West. On 2 October 1795, the Count of Artois landed with a Royalist force on the Île d'Yeu. Because Grouchy held the coast with good troops, the Count gave up and returned to England. On 26 December 1795, the French government combined the Army of the West and the Armies of the Coasts of Brest and Cherbourg into a single Army of the Coasts of the Ocean under Hoche. The new army had a nominal strength of 182,956 but really there were 100,000 men present for duty.

=== Second creation ===
On 14 January 1800, the Army of England was renamed the Army of the West and the order went into effect on 17 January. The army's area of operations included the 12th, 13th and 22nd Military Divisions. Guillaume Brune was commander-in-chief until 16 April. Brune was provisionally replaced by Gabriel Marie Joseph d'Hédouville who served until 2 May. Jean Baptiste Bernadotte became the commander from 3 May to 10 October when he was replaced by interim leader Jacques Louis François Delaistre de Tilly. On 5 May 1801, Bernadotte reassumed command and served until mid-November. On 23 September the army's district was reduced to the 13th Military Division. Henri François Delaborde was interim commander from mid-November until 20 May 1802 when the Army of the West was suppressed.

== Commanders-in-chief ==
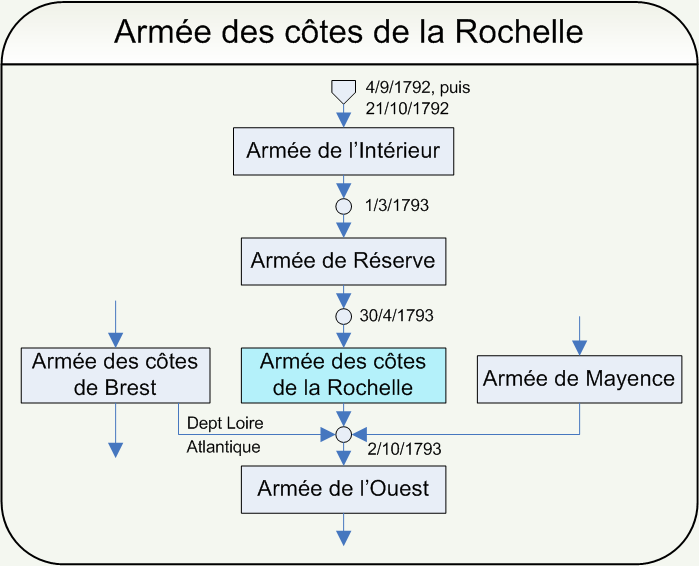
Formation of the Army of the West (Armée de l'Ouest)

=== 1793–1796 ===
- 6 – 27 October 1793 : Jean Léchelle
- 28 October – 13 November 1793 : Alexis Chalbos (provisional)
- 14 November – 4 December 1793 : Jean Antoine Rossignol
- 5 – 25 December 1793 : François Séverin Marceau-Desgraviers
- 26 December 1793 – 17 May 1794 : Louis Marie Turreau
- 18 May – 6 September 1794 : Louis Antoine Vimeux (provisional)
- 7 September 1794 – 23 October 1794 : Thomas-Alexandre Dumas
- 24 October 1794 – 6 September 1795 : Jean Baptiste Camille Canclaux
- 7 – 10 September 1795 : Emmanuel de Grouchy (interim)
- 11 September – 17 December 1795 : Lazare Hoche
- 18 December 1795 – 6 January 1796 : Amédée Willot (interim)

=== 1800–1802 ===
- 17 January 1800 – 26 April 1800 : Guillaume Brune
- 27 April – 2 May 1800 : Gabriel Marie Joseph d'Hédouville (provisional)
- 3 May – 10 October 1800 : Jean Baptiste Bernadotte
- 11 October 1800 – 4 May 1801 : Jacques Louis François Delaistre de Tilly (interim)
- 5 May – mid-November 1801 : Jean Baptiste Bernadotte
- mid-November – 20 May 1802 : Henri François Delaborde (interim)
