= Second Battle of Cholet =

Battle of the War in the Vendée

- Part of the War in the Vendée
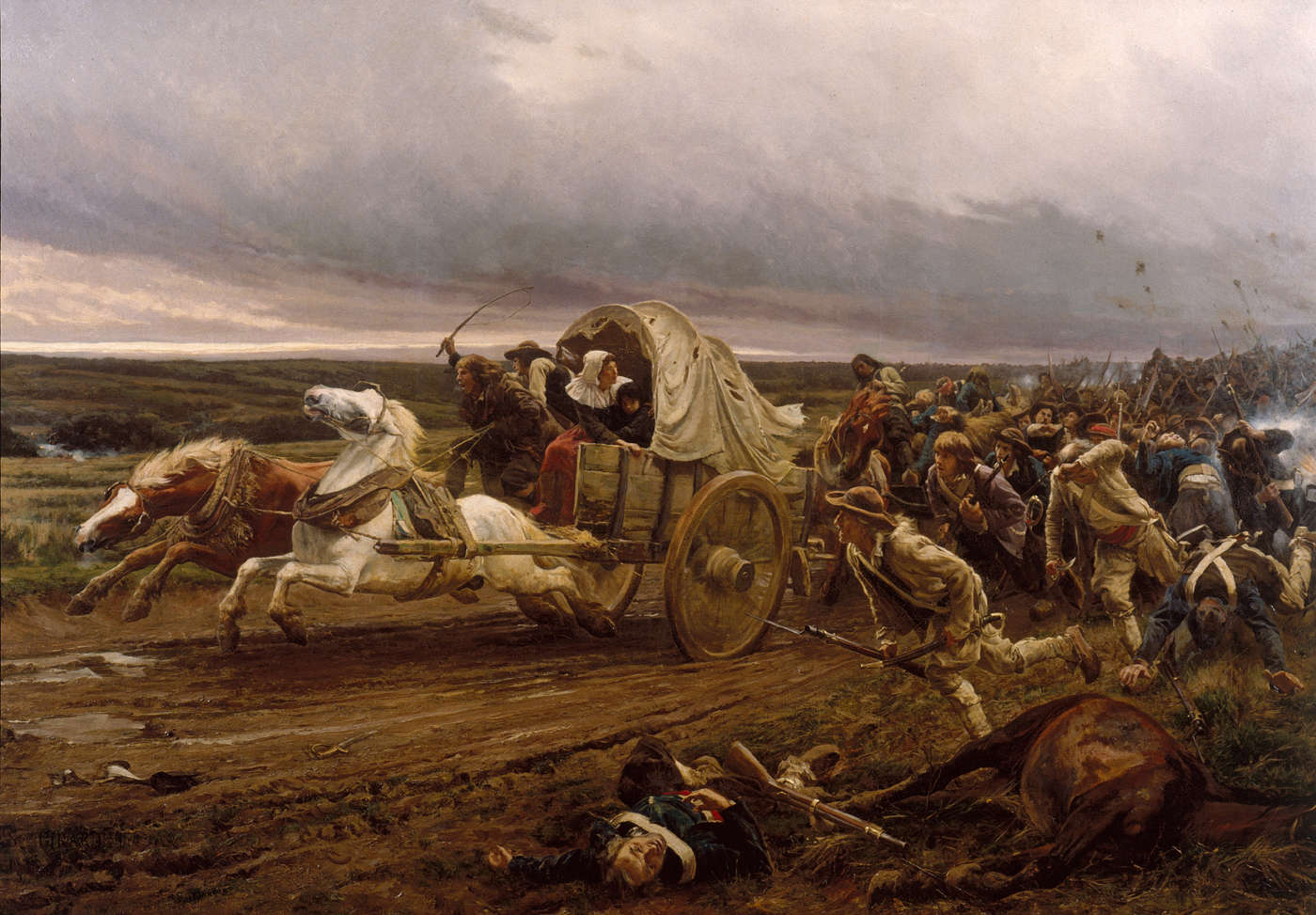
- La déroute de Cholet, by Jules Girardet
Date	17 October 1793
Location	Maine-et-Loire, France
Result	French Republican victory

Belligerents
(French First Republic) French Republic	French Royalists

Commanders and leaders
(French First Republic) Jean-Baptiste Kléber (French First Republic) Jean Léchelle (French First Republic) François Marceau (French First Republic) Michel de Beaupuy (French First Republic) Nicolas Haxo (French First Republic) Louis Vimeux (French First Republic) Marc Scherb (French First Republic) Antoine Bard (French First Republic) Alexis Chalbos (French First Republic) François Muller (French First Republic) François-Joseph Westermann	Maurice d'Elbée (WIA); Charles Bonchamps †; Henri du Vergier; Jean-Nicolas Stofflet; Charles de Royrand; Gaspard de Marigny; François de Lyrot; Piron de La Varenne

Units involved
(French First Republic) Army of the West	Catholic and Royal Army

Strength
26,000	40,000

Casualties and losses
4,000 killed or wounded	8,000 killed or wounded 12 cannons lost

The Second Battle of Cholet was fought on 17 October 1793 during the French Revolutionary Wars, between French Republican forces under generals Jean Léchelle (de jure) and Jean-Baptiste Kléber (de facto) and French Royalist Forces under Maurice d'Elbée. The battle was fought in the town of Cholet in the Maine-et-Loire department of France, and resulted in a Republican victory. D'Elbée was wounded and captured; he was later executed by Republican troops in Noirmoutier. The Royalist insurgent, Charles Melchior Artus de Bonchamps, was fatally wounded in the battle.

== Prelude ==
On the morning of 16 October 1793, the Vendéen army, beaten at the Battle of La Tremblaye, with neither ammunition nor artillery, had evacuated Cholet to take up positions in Beaupréau. The republican avant-garde, commanded by Beaupuy, entered in the town square by the south and moved through the town to settle on the high grounds north of the town. Kléber then deployed the remainder of his troops by positioning the divisions of Beaupuy and Haxo on the left flank of the château de La Treille, and those of Louis Vimeux on the right flank of the château de Bois-Grolleau.

As for François Séverin Marceau-Desgraviers, who had just been promoted general of brigade after the Battle of La Tremblaye, he occupied the center with general Marc Amand Élisée Scherb, in front of the Papinière moorland where the terrain was open. Kléber informed Jean Léchelle of the situation, who was the chief general of the Army of the West, and he approved. The military competencies of Léchelle were known to be null and so most of the representatives had agreed to unofficially entrust the commandment to Kléber.

That evening, Commissioners Pierre Bourbotte, René-Pierre Choudieu, Fayaud and Bellegarde arrived which brought the number of representatives in Cholet to seven since Antoine Merlin de Thionville, Jean-Baptiste Carrier and Louis Marie Turreau were already there. The republican forces waited again for a reinforcement of 10,000 men of General Alexis Chalbos before pushing further to the north and towards Beaupréau, but they arrived during the night.

== Republican strategy ==
The republican generals met in a war counsel early on 17 October. Kléber offered to divide the army in three columns and to march to Saint-Florent-le-Vieil, Gesté and Beaupréau in order to surround the Vendéen army and cut it off from the Loire and the road to Nantes. The strategy was approved by the generals from Mayenne, by Marceau and by Merlin de Thionville, however a few other representatives and officers, particularly Chalbos, were against it. Chalbos thought the troops were too tired and the other officers were against dividing the army. Kléber's plan was rejected and the counsel opted for an undivided march to Beaupréau.

== Vendéen strategy ==
At Beaupréau, the Vendéen officers were as divided as the former during the war counsel held at noon on 16 October. Bonchamps offered to have his Breton soldiers pass the Loire to start an uprising in Brittany and get reinforcements. Talmont, d'Autichamp and Donissan wanted the whole army to go. On the other hand, d'Elbée, La Rochejaquelein and Stofflet refused to leave Vendée. As for Royrand, he wished to try to breach enemy lines by the west in order to meet with Charette's army.

Finally, an attack on Cholet was decided and the army started its march. Nonetheless, Talmont was allowed to leave for Saint-Florent-le-Vieil with 4,000 men to take Varades.

== The battle ==
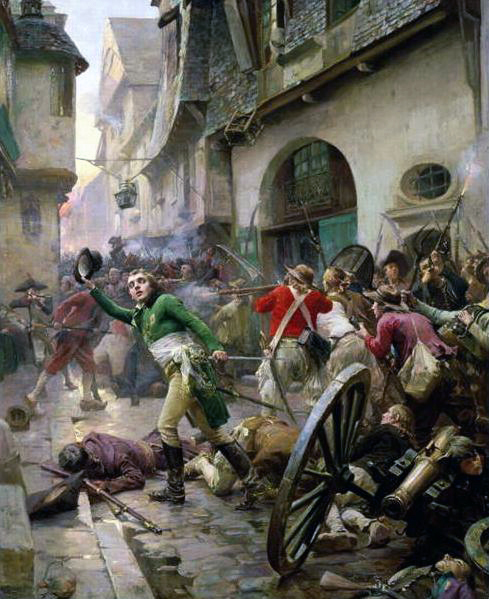
Henri de La Rochejaquelein fighting at Cholet, 17 Octobre 1793, by Paul-Émile Boutigny.

In early afternoon of 17 October, the Vendéen army regrouped and strong of 40,000 men started the offensive on republican lines north of Cholet. Rapidly it managed to push back Beaupuy's first lines to the Papinière moorlands. The Vendéens then burnt down the brooms, creating a huge amount of smoke which prevented the republican artillery from aiming correctly.

The Vendéens advanced in formation like regular troops, in three tight lines, which contrasted with their regular tactic. La Rochejaquelein and Royrand commanded the right flank, d'Elbée and Bonchamps the middle, Stofflet and Marigny the left. Marceau's troops which were bombarded by the 22 Vendéen cannons and were clearly inferior in numbers were ready to fall. Kléber thus had the reserve troops intervene. Chalbos' troops and the 4,000 men of François Muller were sent to aid Marceau. Seeing the quantity of Vendéens who were advancing with determination, the arriving republican army fell back to Cholet creating great confusion. Carrier himself fled.

At the same time in Bois-Grolleau, Vimeux and Scherb managed to hold against Stofflet and Marigny. In La Treille, Haxo and Beaupuy's troops were beaten against La Rochejaquelein and Royrand and pulled back to the faubourgs of Cholet. Kléber then joined this flank and regrouped a few battalions from his reserves, and the 109th infantry regiment, and ordered them to flank the Vendéen lines. The order was correctly executed and seeing this troop flank them the Vendéens thought a new republican army had arrived as reinforcements so a moment of hesitation spread in their ranks. Being subjected to the republican counter-attack, they managed to resist a little while, but facing the multiple charges of the troops of Kléber, Bard and Beaupuy, they panicked and fled.

In the middle, Marceau placed his artillery behind his infantry. When the Vendéens attacked, Marceau had his infantry step back to reveal the cannons, which opened fire at the last moment, causing a huge number of losses among Vendéen soldiers. Surprised, the Vendéen middle line fled as well while the republican infantry counter-attacked. D'Elbée and Bonchamps knew victory was close so with a few hundred cavaliers and soldiers they tried to rally their troops. They didn't manage, and ended being encircled by the Republicans. D'Elbée and Bonchamps fell severely wounded practically at the same time. The last Vendéens fled taking their wounded officers with them. The escape became general and "to the Loire" cries could be heard. At Pontreau, the troops of Lyrot and Piron de La Varenne managed to intervene in time to secure the retreat of the Vendéen army to Beaupréau.

== Crossing the Loire ==
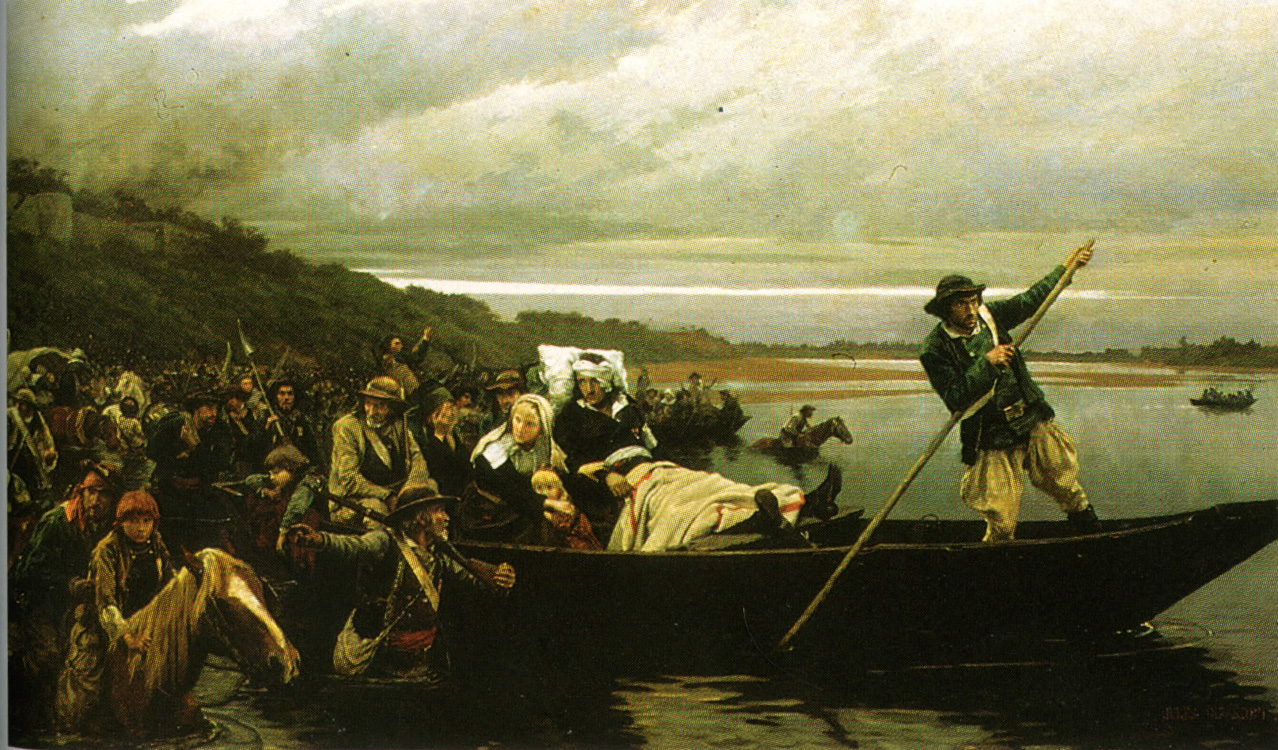
Wounded General Lescure crosses the Loire at Saint-Florent

Once at Beaupréau, the Vendéen generals decided it was best to leave, the entire army moved to Saint-Florent-le-Vieil in order to cross the Loire. The expedition of Talmont on Varades having easily succeeded, the entry to Brittany was free.

Only d'Elbée, severely wounded, did not follow the army. A small number of Vendéen soldiers took him west, to Charette's army, where he could seek refuge at Noirmoutier.

In the meantime, the republican army had returned to Cholet. Westermann who had stayed at Châtillon-sur-Sèvre during the battle wanted to pursue the Vendéens. Followed by the troops of Beaupuy and Haxo, he briefly fought the 8,000-strong Vendéen rear guard but managed to reach Beaupréau. The town was deserted except for 400 wounded Vendéens, who were killed as revenge of the massacre of the republican wounded soldiers at the Battle of Clisson.

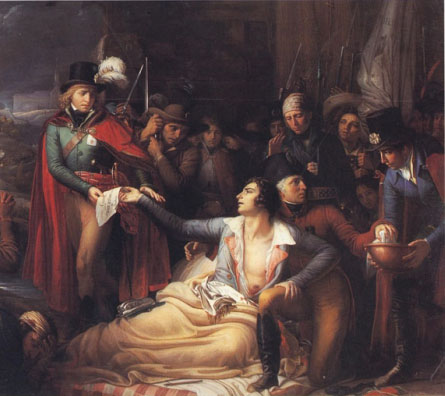
Death of Bonchamps (detail), by George Degeorge, 1837.

On 17 October and 18, small Vendéen boats went back and forth over the Loire to bring the Vendéen army to the other side, accompanied by tens of thousands of wounded, elderly, women and children. The Vendéens also had 4,000 to 5,000 republican prisoners who could not be transported across the river, and as such were at a loss to determine their fate.

In her memoirs, Victoire de Donnissan de La Rochejaquelein said the officers all agreed to have them executed, but none would dare give the order. The presence of republican prisoners caught the eye of the Vendéen soldiers, who wanted to kill them to avenge their wounded generals and the ravages of the republican army.

The general Charles de Bonchamps had been transported to a house in Saint-Florent-le-Vieil. Severely wounded, he was dying when he heard that the republican troops were to be executed. He ordered his second, Charles de Beaumont d'Autichamp, to prevent that from happening, his dying wish.

D'Autichamp thus showed up and told the soldiers that the dying general wished that the prisoners be spared. Bonchamps was very popular amongst his soldiers and so they obeyed, and the prisoners were set free.

== Virée de Galerne ==
The republicans were celebrating after the victory at Cholet, certain that the war was definitively won and that the last Vendéens pushed off to the Loire would be easily destroyed. On 19 October at 3 in the morning, the first detachment of hussards of captain Hauteville (second to Westermann) entered an astonishingly deserted Saint-Florent-le-Vieil. All the Vendéens had managed to pass to the northern side of the Loire, which the republicans thought to be an impossible feat in such little time. Charles de Bonchamps had died 4 hours earlier and was buried at the Varades cemetery.

The republican prisoners were found quickly and Merlin de Thionville wrote to the Committee of Public Safety that he had told the republican soldiers that they need not feel any recognition to the Vendéens, "enemies of the Nation", and hoped this episode would be forgotten in history.

Contrary to republican hopes, the war was not over. A new campaign called the Virée de Galerne started, aiming to spread the uprising north of the Loire to Brittany and Maine.
