= Battle of La Tremblaye =

Part of the War in the Vendée

Coordinates: 47.0144°N 0.9014°W

- Part of the War in the Vendée
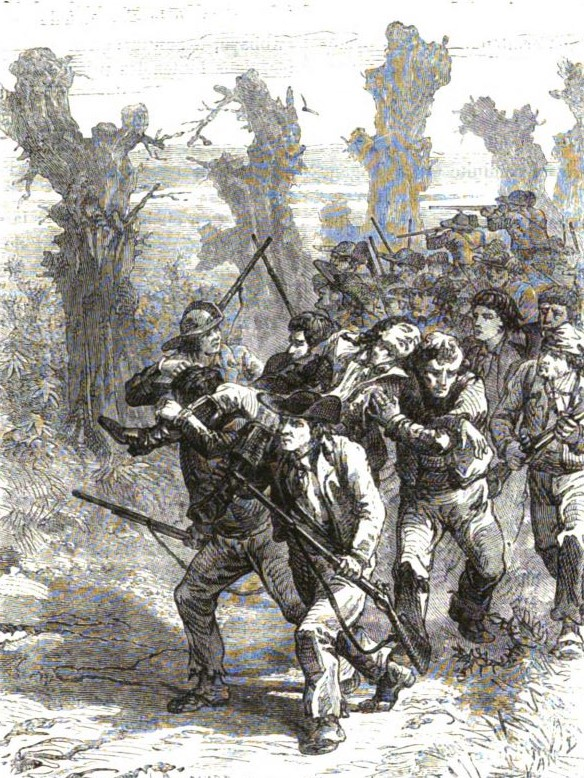
- The wounded Lescure is carried by his soldiers
Date	15 October 1793
Location	Cholet, France
Result	French Republican victory

Belligerents
(France) French Republic	French Royalists

Commanders and leaders
(France) Jean Léchelle (France) Françoi Marceau (France) Jean-Baptiste Kléber (France) Michel de Beaupuy (France) Antoine Bard	Maurice d'Elbée; Marquis de Lescure (WIA); Charles Bonchamps; Charles de Royrand

Strength
15,000 men	25,000 men

Casualties and losses
500 dead	1,200 to 1,500 dead

The Battle of La Tremblaye (15 October 1793), part of the war in the Vendée, took place near Cholet, and was a Republican victory over the Vendéens.

== Prelude ==
The republican Army of Mainz continued its progress and burnt down everything in its way. On 13 October it took Clisson, then Tiffauges and Torfou on 14 October. On 13 October, Charles de Royrand and his 3,000 men of the Catholic and Royal Army of Centre took refuge in Mortagne after having been pushed back by the Luçon division of general Antoine Bard, strong of 3,500 soldiers who had burnt down Les Herbiers and La Verrie.

Nevertheless, the Vendéen generals decided to evacuate the town, to fall back on Cholet and sent the artillery to Beaupréau. The order was rapidly executed, on 15 October the troops of general Kléber entered in an abandoned Mortagne, where they found 1,500 republican prisoners whom the Vendéens had forgotten in their cells.

In the meantime, general Alexis Chalbos had regrouped his troops at Bressuire and headed on. The three republican armies converged towards Cholet where the decisive battle seemed to have to take place.

== The battle ==
Vendéen generals D'Elbée, Lescure, Bonchamps and Royrand deployed their troops at Saint-Christophe-du-Bois. D'Elbée had sent a letter to Charette asking of him to attack the republicans by the side but he hadn't received any response.

On 15 October, the troops of the Army of Mainz and of the Luçon division started the attack close to the castle of La Tremblaye, south-west of Cholet. Lescure managed to push off the Luçon division which was tired after many days of walking. The general Bard, wounded, had to be replaced by his lieutenant, Marceau. But Beaupuy arrived later with reinforcements and pushed off the Vendéens. Lescure was busy rallying his men when a bullet hit him in the head and wounded him severely. This demoralized the Vendéens who thought the general had been killed and they pulled back to Cholet.

== Aftermath ==
That evening, the Vendéen counsel met at Cholet while the republican soldiers were camping in front of the town. The generals wanted to defend the town square but their troops had little ammunition, and the artillery and powder were at Beaupréau with general Marigny. The Prince of Talmont, cavalry general, was given the task of finding ammunition but by 4 in the morning he had still not returned.

Eventually, the Vendéen generals decided to evacuate Cholet and fall back at Beaupréau, thus abandoning the town to the republicans.

== Sources ==
- Jean Tabeur, Paris contre la Province, les guerres de l'Ouest, éditions Economica, 2008, p. 145-146.
- Yves Gras, La Guerre de Vendée, éditions Economica, 1994, p. 83.
