= Antoine Louis François Sergent dit Sergent-Marceau =

French printmaker and painter

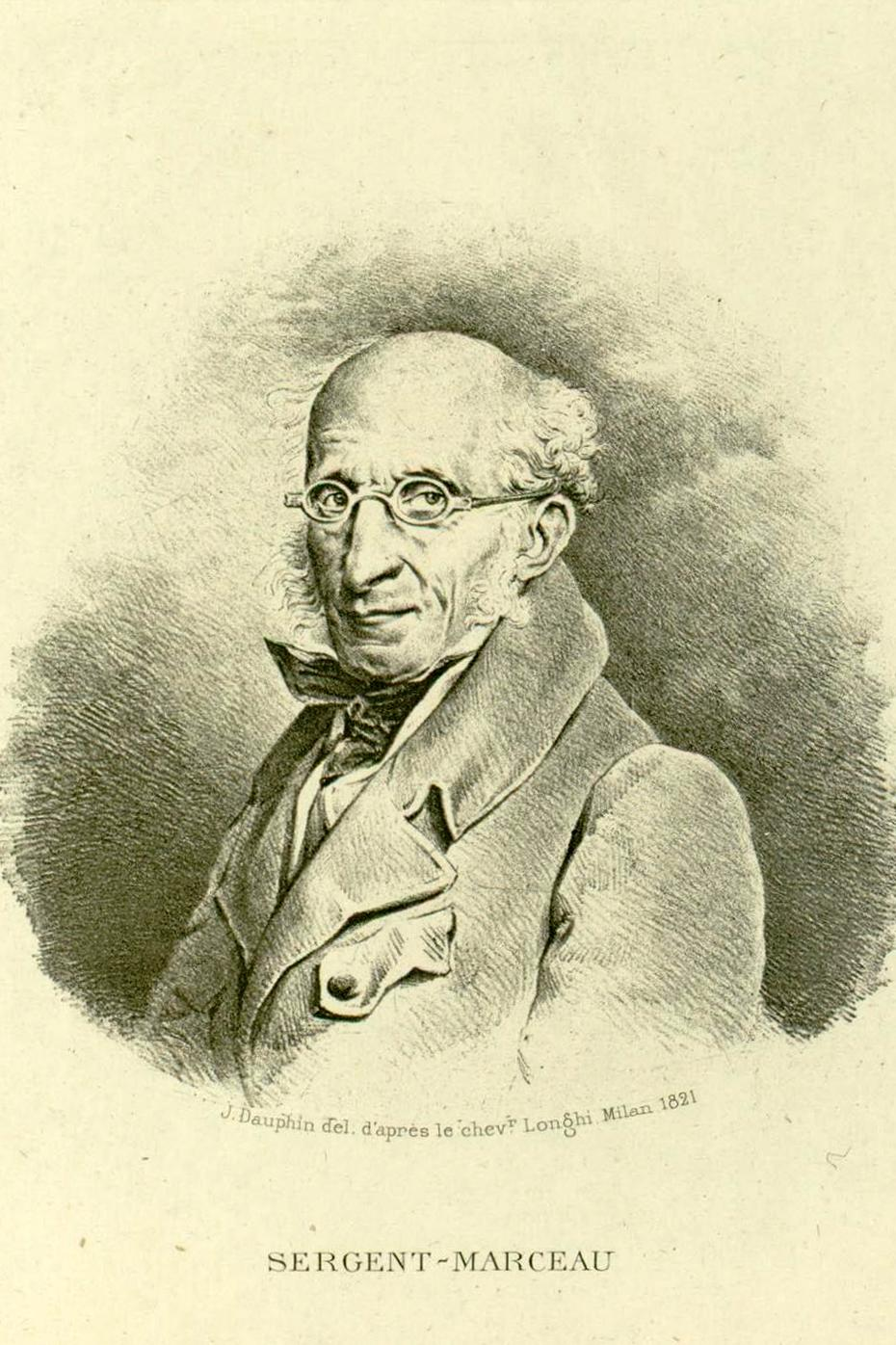
- Sergent-Marceau (1821), drawing by J. Dauphin after the chevalier Longhi.
- Born: 9 September 1751, 9 October 1751; Chartres
- Died: 24 July 1847; Nice
- Occupations: Politician, copper engraver, watercolorist, writer

Signature
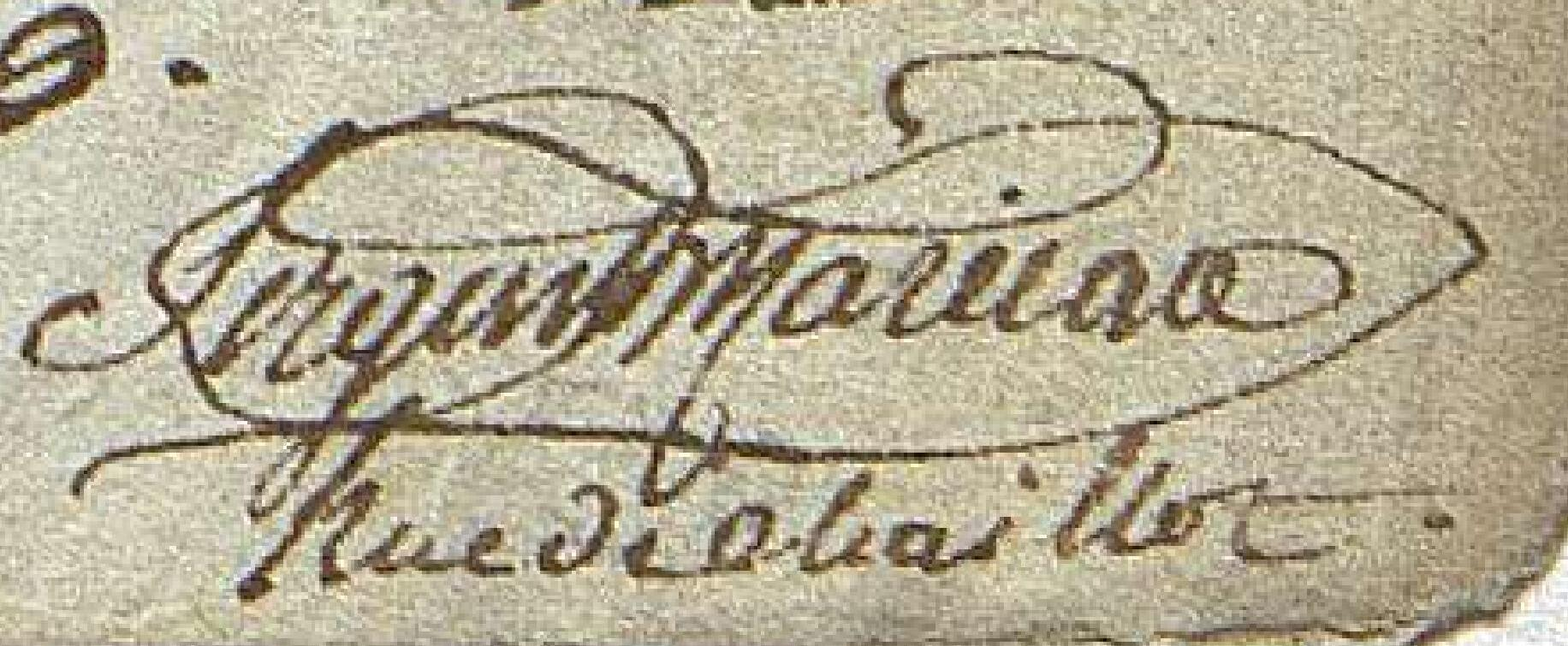

Antoine Louis François Sergent, called Sergent-Marceau (1751–1847) was a French painter and printmaker.

He was active during the French Revolution, and sat on the National Convention in 1792.

In 1789, Sergent worked with engraver Marie Louise Marceau-Desgraviers, sister of the revolutionary general François Séverin Marceau, on a project to create portraits of the French legislative assembly. Marceau later took the first name Emira (an anagram of Marie), and Sergent and Marceau married in 1795.
