= Battle of Fougères =

Battle during War of the Vendee

- Part of the War in the Vendée
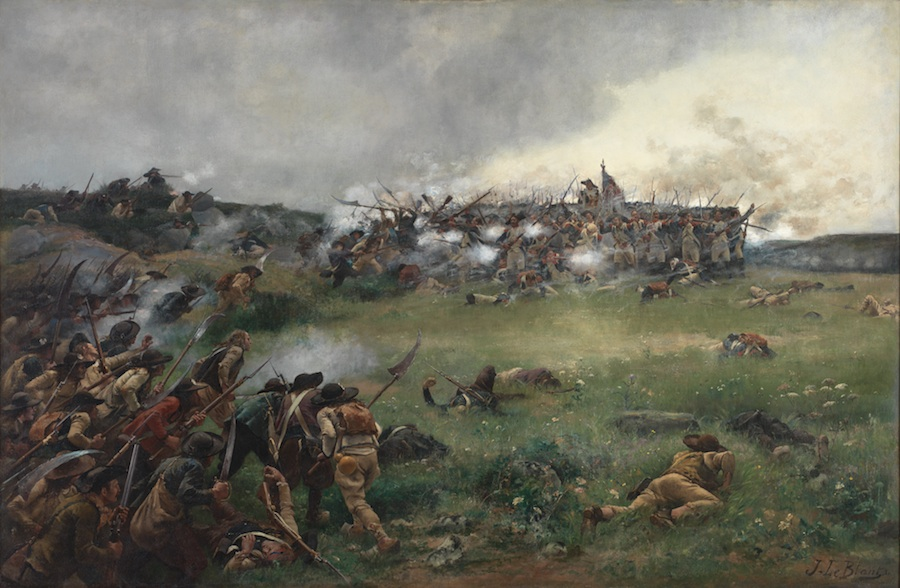
- Le bataillon carré, Affaire de Fougères, oil on canvas by Julien Le Blant, 1793
Date	3 November 1793
Location	Fougères 48.3525°N 1.1986°W
Result	Vendéen victory

Belligerents
(France) French Republic	Vendeans

Commanders and leaders
• Simon-Pierre Brière • Alexandre d'Obenheim • Louis Rallier	• Henri de La Rochejaquelein • Jean-Nicolas Stofflet • Antoine-Philippe de La Trémoille de Talmont

Strength
6,000 men	30,000 men 50 cannons

Casualties and losses
200–600 killed 400–800 captured	Unknown
- Fougeres Battle of Fougères (Europe)

The Battle of Fougères took place on 3 November 1793 during the Virée de Galerne, and the War in the Vendée. It pitted the troops of the Catholic and Royal Army against the Republican troops of Fougères, eight months after the start of the Vendée insurrection and in the middle of the war between France and the First Coalition, which notably included Great Britain.

After its defeat at the Battle of Cholet in October 1793, the Vendée army crossed the Loire and occupied Laval. The general staff then hesitated between several strategic options: return to the Vendée, march on Rennes to provoke an insurrection in Brittany or move closer to the coast and seize a port on the Channel in the hope of receiving help from the British and the émigrés present in Jersey.

The Vendée army finally took the road to Fougères, which had the advantage of bringing it closer to both the Channel and Rennes. The assault resulted in an easy victory for the Vendeans: outnumbered and poorly commanded, the Republicans were crushed and abandoned the city, leaving behind hundreds of dead and prisoners.

The Vendean army occupied the city for five days during which it worked to resupply and recruit supporters. It received two émigré emissaries carrying dispatches from the British government advising them to turn away from Rennes and follow the English plan. The army resumed its route on 8 November towards Dol-de-Bretagne, hesitating between an attack on Saint-Malo or Granville. But a junction with the British proved impossible and the Vendean army headed back south.

Reoccupied in mid-November, Fougères definitively returned to Republican control on 5 December. The region became one of the centers of Chouannerie after the defeat of the Vendée army at Savenay, in Loire-Inférieure, on 23 December.

== Background ==
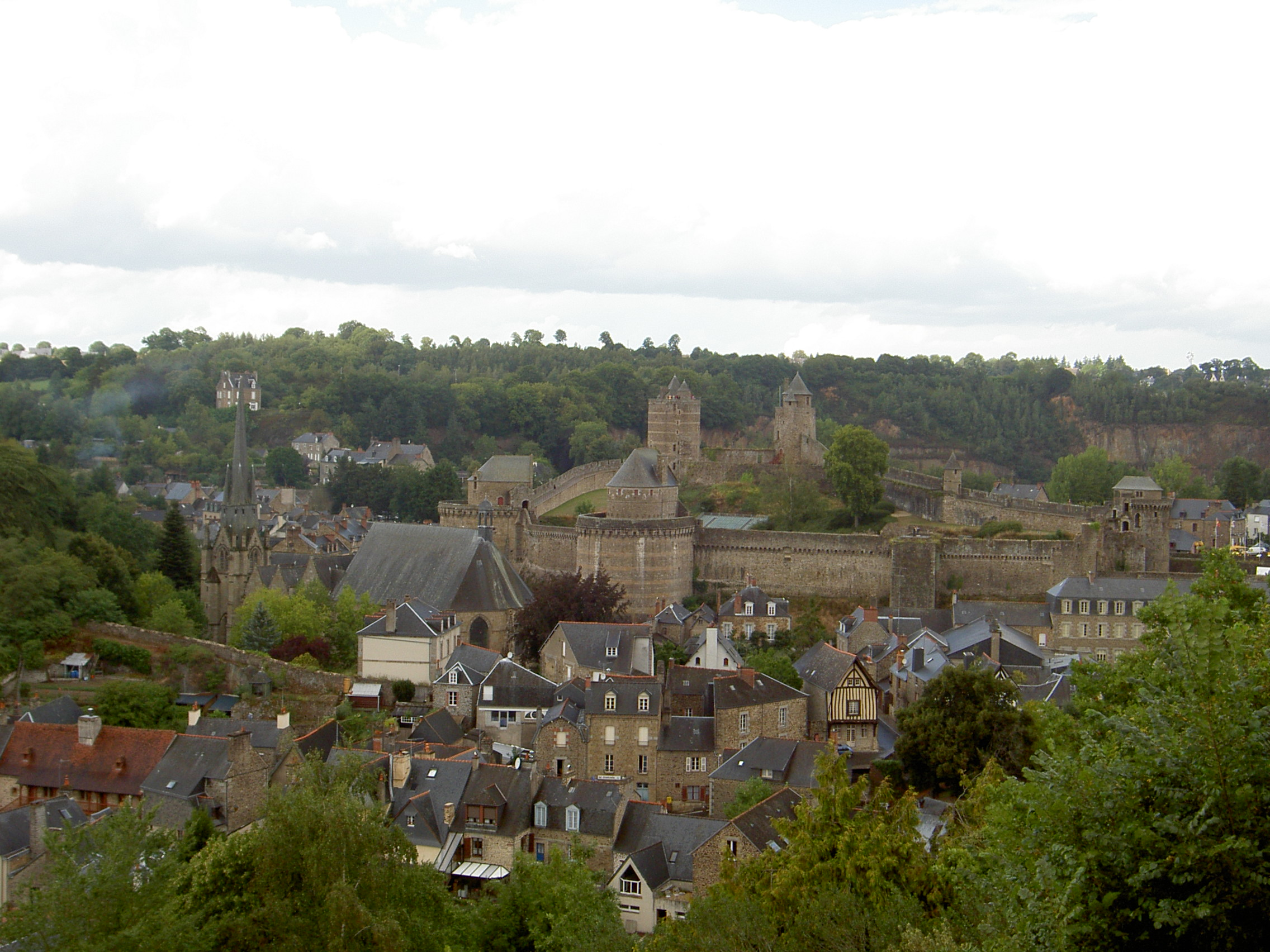
View in 2006 of the old town and the castle of Fougères, from the public garden.

During the French Revolution, the district of Fougères, located in the extreme north-east of the department of Ille-et-Vilaine, experienced numerous counter-revolutionary unrest. From 1791 to 1793, it was the epicentre of the Breton conspiracy of the Marquis de La Rouërie. In August 1792, a royalist insurrection broke out in the neighbouring department of Mayenne, in Saint-Ouën-des-Toits, and in the weeks that followed the Mayenne insurgents, led by Jean Cottereau, known as "Jean Chouan", made several incursions into the regions of Fougères and Vitré. In March 1793, a vast insurrection against the mass levy shook several regions of north-west France, particularly the district of Fougères, where 21 parishes took up arms. Several thousand peasants tried to enter the city on 19 March, but were easily repelled by the National Guards. On 24 March, the revolt was crushed. The toll was fifteen insurgents killed and a hundred others taken prisoner, of whom 14 were sentenced to death and guillotined on 13 April and 22 May. The unrest calmed down but did not disappear completely. In the months that followed, many young people refused to enlist and hid in the Fougères forest.

However, if the revolts of March 1793 were repressed north of the Loire, this was not the case in the south, where they marked the beginning of the War in the Vendée. After several months of indecisive fighting, the Vendéen insurgents of the Catholic and Royal Army suffered a heavy defeat against the Republicans at the Battle of Cholet on 17 October. Cornered, the Vendéens crossed the Loire on 18 and 19 October and moved north of the river, which led to the start of the Virée de Galerne campaign.

After crossing the Loire, the Vendéens headed towards the department of Mayenne and captured Laval on 22 October. The news reached Fougères on 23 or 25 October, causing concern in the town, which feared being attacked in turn. Defensive measures were taken by Captain Rallier, a former engineer officer. The passage through the Porte Roger, to the east, was notably barricaded and made impassable.

The royalists of the region also came out of hiding. On 24 October, a troop of 260 men from the Fougères region, commanded by Aimé Picquet du Boisguy, joined by another of 500 to 600 men from the surroundings of Vitré and western Mayenne, led by Louis Hubert, Jean Chouan and the Pinçon brothers, came to join the Vendée army at Laval and were placed under the orders of the Prince of Talmont. On 25 October, other insurgents roamed the communes of Balazé and La Bouëxière, where they disarmed Boissier-Malherbe, the commander of the Fougères national guard. He was denounced as a suspect by the surveillance committee and was placed under house arrest on the orders of the representative on mission, Pierre Pocholle.

On 27 October 1793, the name "chouans" appeared for the first time in a document of the republican administration, when the district of Fougères reported in its register of deliberations:

"The farmers are in a state of worry and alarm, the brigands are in Balazé, fifteen brigands from the Petite Vendée at the head of which are the chouan brothers. It seems that these men were the same as those who made an incursion in mid-August on Moncontour, Châtillon, Parcé".

The term would quickly become common to designate the insurgents from the north of the Loire.

== Order of Battle ==
=== Republican Army ===
When the Vendéan army crossed the Loire on 18 October 1793, the town of Fougères was garrisoned only by its National Guard and a battalion of chasseurs. Like other towns in the region, it feared an attack and requested reinforcements. Anxieties increased after the Battle of Laval, the district administrators of the region anticipated that the Vendéens march on either Fougères or Vitré to attack Rennes. The representative Pierre-Pomponne-Amédée Pocholle, alors en mission en Ille-et-Vilaine, ordered Fougères be resupplied grain to host a substantial garrison. A few days later, the Director of Avranches announce dispatching to Fougères of 800 to 900 men from the 8th battalion of volunteers of Calvados and the National Guard alongside four cannons. In 24 October, the district of Mortain announce the departure of 300 men to support the town. On 30 October, from Avranches, the representative on mission Garnier de Saintes informed général Vergnes, in Rennes, of his intention to defend Fougères with 3 000 men and eight pieces of cannons would be stationed that following day. The soldiers were kept in a retirement home, among Urbanistes, or quartered in private homes.

The garrison was placed under the command of the Adjudant General Simon-Pierre Brière, who arrived in Fougères on the 26 October. He was followed on 1 November by an engineering officer, Alexandre Magnus d'Obenheim, who had been sent from Cherbourg arrange the town's defence. At the moment of the Vendéens’ attack, the town's garrison included the Chasseurs Battalion of Charente, the 19th Light Infantry Battalion, known as the Imbert's Chasseurs, the 6th Battalion of volunteers from Côte-d'Or, the 3rd Battalion of volunteers from Calvados, the 8th Battalion of volunteers from Calvados, a battalion of volunteers from Seine-et-Oise, a detached company of gunners de la section du Contrat-Social, and 3000 to 4000 men from the National Guard of Fougères and other communes in the district, Saint-Georges-de-Reintembault, Louvigné-du-Désert, Antrain, La Bazouge-du-Désert and Saint-Marc-le-Blanc, as well as Norman communes which were Mortain, Vire, Coutances, Granville, Saint-James and Sourdeval. According d'Obenheim's journal, (Note: Captain d’Obenheim wrote, after the battle, the Memoir written by Citizen Dobenheim, Captain of Engineers, upon his return among his brothers, the accuracy of which remains questionable given the circumstances.) only half of the National Guard was armed with pikes. Altogether, all the forces numbered approximately 6000 to 6500 men.

== Course ==
The Vendéens launched an assault on Fougères, resulting in a decisive victory against the poorly commanded Republican forces. Despite being outnumbered, the Vendéens managed to inflict significant casualties on their opponents, who left behind hundreds of dead and captured soldiers. Following their victory, the Vendéens occupied Fougères for five days, utilizing this time to gather supplies and recruit local supporters. During this period, they received two emissaries from the British government who encouraged them to abandon their plans for Rennes and adhere to a strategy aligned with British interests.

On 8 November, after consolidating their position, the Vendéens resumed their march towards Dol-de-Bretagne, still uncertain whether to attack Saint-Malo or Granville. However, following a brief reoccupation of Fougères in mid-November, Republican forces regained control of the city on 18 November.

== Cited works ==
- Aubrée, Étienne (1936). Le général de Lescure (in French). Librairie académique Perrin.
- Dupuy, Roger (2004). La Bretagne sous la Révolution et l'Empire, 1789-1815 (in French). éditions Ouest-France université, Rennes. ISBN 9782737335020.
- Dupuy, Roger (1997). Les Chouans (in French). Paris: Hachette Littérature.
- Gillot, Colonel (1950). Fougères: ville d'art (in French). Arthaud.
- Gréau, Pierre (2010). "Organisation de l'Armée catholique et royale outre-Loire 18 octobre - 23 décembre 1793". In Hervé Coutau-Bégarie; Charles Doré-Graslin (dir.) (eds.). Histoire militaire des guerres de Vendée (in French). Economica.
- Le Bouteiller, Christian (1988). La Révolution dans le Pays de Fougères (in French). Société archéologique et historique de l'arrondissement de Fougères.
- Lemas, Théodore (1994). Le district de Fougères pendant les Guerres de l'Ouest et de la Chouannerie 1793-1800 (in French). Rue des Scribes Éditions. ISBN 9782906064287.
- Le Menuet de La Jugannière, Baron (1912). "Campagne d'Outre-Loire de l'Armée Vendéenne (1793)". Recueil des publications de la Société havraise d'études diverses.
- Loidreau, Simone (2010). "Vendéens et Chouans". In Hervé Coutau-Bégarie; Charles Doré-Graslin (dir.) (eds.). Histoire militaire des guerres de Vendée (in French). Economica.
- Martin, Jean-Clément (2014). La guerre de Vendée 1793-1800 (in French). Points. ISBN 9782757836569.
- Monod, Gabriel (1897). "Bulletin historique". Revue historique. Félix Alcan.
- Pautrel, Émile (1927). Notions d'Histoire et d'Archéologie pour la région de Fougères (in French). Imprimerie typographique et lithographique H. Riou-Reuzé.
- Pontbriand, Toussaint du Breil de (1988) [1897]. Mémoire du colonel de Pontbriand sur les guerres de la Chouannerie (in French). édition Plon, Paris.
