= Second Battle of Châtillon =

1793 battle

Coordinates: 46°55′25″N 0°44′54″W

- Part of the War in the Vendée
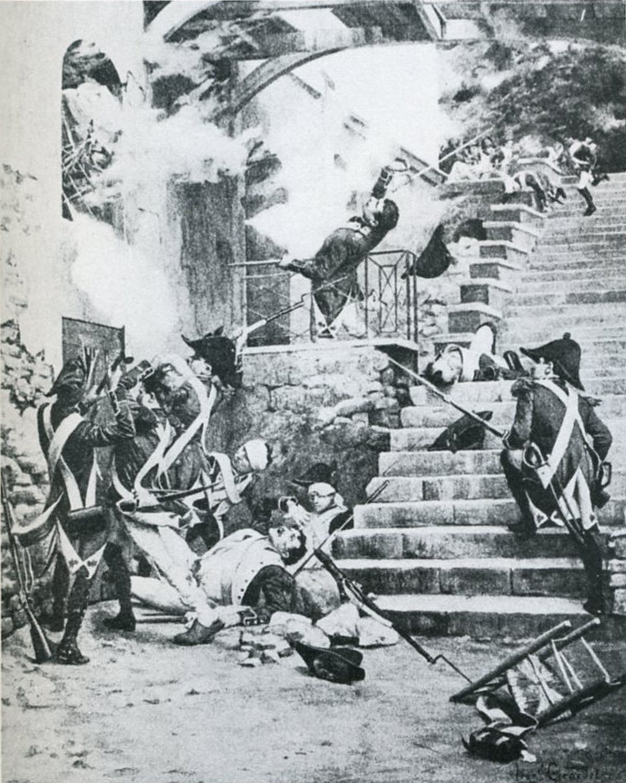
- Street Fight, painting by Léon Girardet
Date	11 October 1793
Location	Châtillon-sur-Sèvre, France
Result	Inconclusive

Belligerents
(Kingdom of France) French Royalists	Republican France

Commanders and leaders
(Kingdom of France) Louis de Lescure (Kingdom of France) Charles Bonchamps	(France) Alexis Chalbos (France) F.-J. Westermann (France) François Muller (France) René Lecomte †

Units involved
(Kingdom of France) Catholic and Royal Army	(France) Army of the Coasts of La Rochelle

Strength
Unknown	20,000

The Second Battle of Châtillon (11 October 1793) was fought between Royalist and Republican French forces at Châtillon-sur-Sèvre during the War in the Vendée. A 20,000-man Republican column commanded by Alexis Chalbos from the Army of the Coasts of La Rochelle was attacked and routed by Vendean Royalist forces led by Louis Marie de Lescure and Charles de Bonchamps. That night a few hundred Republicans under François Joseph Westermann raided the rebel encampment. Before the Vendeans killed or drove them off, the raiders inflicted severe losses on drunken rebel fighters and non-combatant women and children. The Vendeans withdrew toward Mortagne-sur-Sèvre the next day. Republican general René François Lecomte was mortally wounded in the battle, dying a few days later.
