= François Muller =

- Born: 29 January 1764; Saarlouis, Kingdom of France, now Germany
- Died: 23 September 1808 (aged 44) Orléans, Loiret, France
- Allegiance: Kingdom of France; France
- Branch: Cavalry, Infantry
- Service years: (Kingdom of France) 1783–1789 (France) 1792–1801
- Rank: General of Division
- Conflicts: War in the Vendée; Second Battle of Châtillon; Second Battle of Cholet; Battle of Dol; Battle of Le Mans; War of the First Coalition; Battle of Grandreng; Battle of Erquelinnes; Battle of Gosselies; Battle of Lambusart; Battle of Fleurus; War of the Second Coalition; Battle of Genola

François Muller (29 January 1764 – 23 September 1808) became a division commander during the French Revolutionary Wars. He enlisted in the French Royal Army as a cavalry trooper in 1783 and served until 1789. He joined a Paris volunteer battalion in 1792 and became an officer. Sent to fight in the War in the Vendée, he was promoted general of brigade and general of division within the span of nine days. His division ran away at both Cholet and Le Mans and he was reportedly drunk at the Battle of Dol, yet he was transferred in March 1794 to the Army of the North. In May and June he led a combat division at the battles of Grandreng, Erquelinnes, Gosselies, Lambusart and Fleurus. Removed from command in August 1794, he was thereafter assigned to posts in the interior. He led a division at Genola in November 1799 before being deactivated in 1801. Entangled in the 1804 affair of Jean Victor Marie Moreau, he was placed under house arrest at Orléans and died there in 1808.
