= Marc Amand Élisée Scherb =

Marc Armand Elisée Scherb
- Born: 25 April 1747; Westhoffen (Bas-Rhin), France
- Died: 2 July 1838 (aged 91) Westhoffen (Bas-Rhin), France
- Allegiance: France
- Branch: French Army
- Service years: 1766–1815
- Rank: General of Brigade
- Conflicts: French Revolutionary Wars
- Awards: Order of Saint-Louis (1791); Légion d'honneur (1804)

Marc Armand Elisée Scherb (25 April 1747 in Westhoffen, Bas-Rhin – 2 July 1838 in Westhoffen), was a brigadier general in the French Revolutionary Wars.

== Family ==
He was the son of John Scherb, a notary, born 6 July 1712. His brother Leopold (31 May 1776 – 24 May 1842) was a colonel of cuirassiers; Leopold ended his career as a chef d'escadron. (Note: Leopold-Elisee Scherb, chef d'scadron, d 24 May 1842. Upon his death, his widow and children obtained rights to his military pension of 500 francs: Widow, Marie-Antoinette-Reine Kein, b. 13 August 1787, Strasbourg. Children: Raymond Leopold b. 27 Jan 1811, Neuviller, Victoire-Marie-Josephine-Francoise, Marie-Elise-Marguerite born 18 June 1817, Saverne; Caroline Victoire-Leopoldine, b. 4 Nov 1827, Saverne. Ancestry.com. France, Civil and Military Pensions, 1836–1862. (Bulletin des Lois) [database on-line]. Provo, UT, USA: Ancestry.com Operations Inc, 2012. Série 9, Vol. 24, N° 673–696 (subscription required))

== Service ==
Scherb was a cadet in the Infantry Regiment Anhalt on 20 October 1766 and lieutenant on 16 October 1768. In 1769, Scherb served in military during the French conquest of Corsica. He was promoted to lieutenant on 14 January 1777, and to captain on 16 September 1778. As lieutenant colonel, he commanded a battalion of grenadiers under General Adam Philippe Custine on 20 October 1792. As adjutant general, he was brigade leader on 8 March 1793. He was wounded in his right foot by shrapnel and a shot broke his left leg, and subsequently served at the headquarters in Mainz in 1793. He also commanded the second column of the Mainz garrison on 22 July 1793; subsequently he commanded the garrison at Brest on 17 August 1793.

He was charged with suppressing the revolt in the Vendée, in particular at the Battle of Savenay, on 13 July 1794. The representatives on mission of the Army of the Rhine and Moselle appointed him provisionally as brigadier general on 6 December 1794. He commanded the Second Brigade, in the division of Laurent de Gouvion Saint-Cyr, at Mainz on 4 January 1795. His appointment as brigadier was confirmed by the Committee of Public Safety on 13 June 1795.

As part of Pierre Anton Courtot's eighth division at Mainz on 29 October 1795, he was under the command of Pierre Marie Barthélemy Ferino in the Army of the Rhine and Moselle on 30 December 1795 and Guillaume Philibert Duhesme's sixth division in April 1796. As commander at Landau on 27 April 1796, he crossed the Rhine to watch Philippsburg on 19 July 1796. Throughout the summer of 1796 he remained at Bruchsal, responsible for observation of the garrisons of Mannheim and Philippsburg. In September 1796, it appeared that he would be cut off from the corps of Jean-Baptiste Jourdan, which was retreating toward France north of the Mainz, and Jean Victor Marie Moreau, who was retreating through the Black Forest; he withdrew toward Kehl. During the withdrawal he skirmished with Franz Petrasch until he was cut off from Kehl by the Austrian corps.

He was named Chevalier of Order of Saint-Louis on 10 April 1791 and Officer of the Légion d'honneur on 15 June 1804.
