= Puyréaux =

- Commune
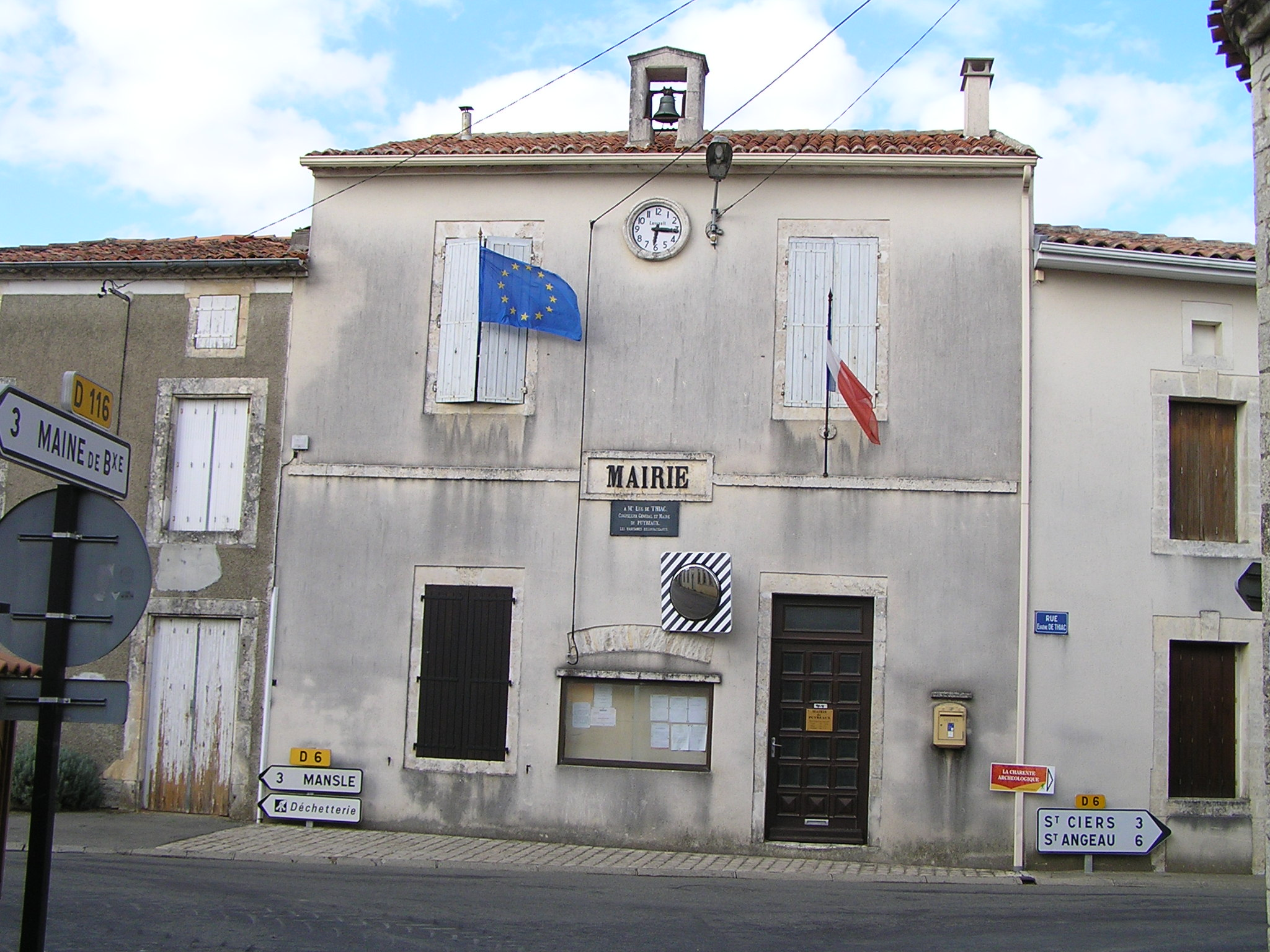
- Town hall
- Location of Puyréaux
- Location within France Location within Nouvelle-Aquitaine
- Coordinates: 45°51′44″N 0°12′46″E
- Country: France
- Region: Nouvelle-Aquitaine
- Department: Charente
- Arrondissement: Confolens
- Canton: Boixe-et-Manslois

Government
  - Mayor (2020–2026): Didier Bertrand
- Area^{1}: 8.11 km^{2} (3.13 sq mi)
- Elevation: 100 m (330 ft)
- Highest elevation: 116 m (381 ft)
- Lowest elevation: 57 m (187 ft)
- Population (2023): 582
  - Density: 71.8/km^{2} (186/sq mi)
- Time zone: UTC+01:00 (CET)
  - Summer (DST): UTC+02:00 (CEST)
- INSEE/Postal code: 16272 /16230
- ^{1} French Land Register data, which excludes lakes, ponds, glaciers > 1 km^{2} (0.386 sq mi or 247 acres) and river estuaries.

Puyréaux (French pronunciation: [pɥiʁeo]) is a commune in the Charente department in southwestern France.

== Population ==
Historical population
Year	Pop.	±% p.a.
1968	334	—
1975	321	−0.57%
1982	361	+1.69%
1990	403	+1.39%
1999	396	−0.19%
2007	455	+1.75%
2012	505	+2.11%
2017	533	+1.09%
2023	582	+1.48%
Source: INSEE

== See also ==
- Communes of the Charente department
