= Antoine Christophe Merlin =

French lawyer and politician

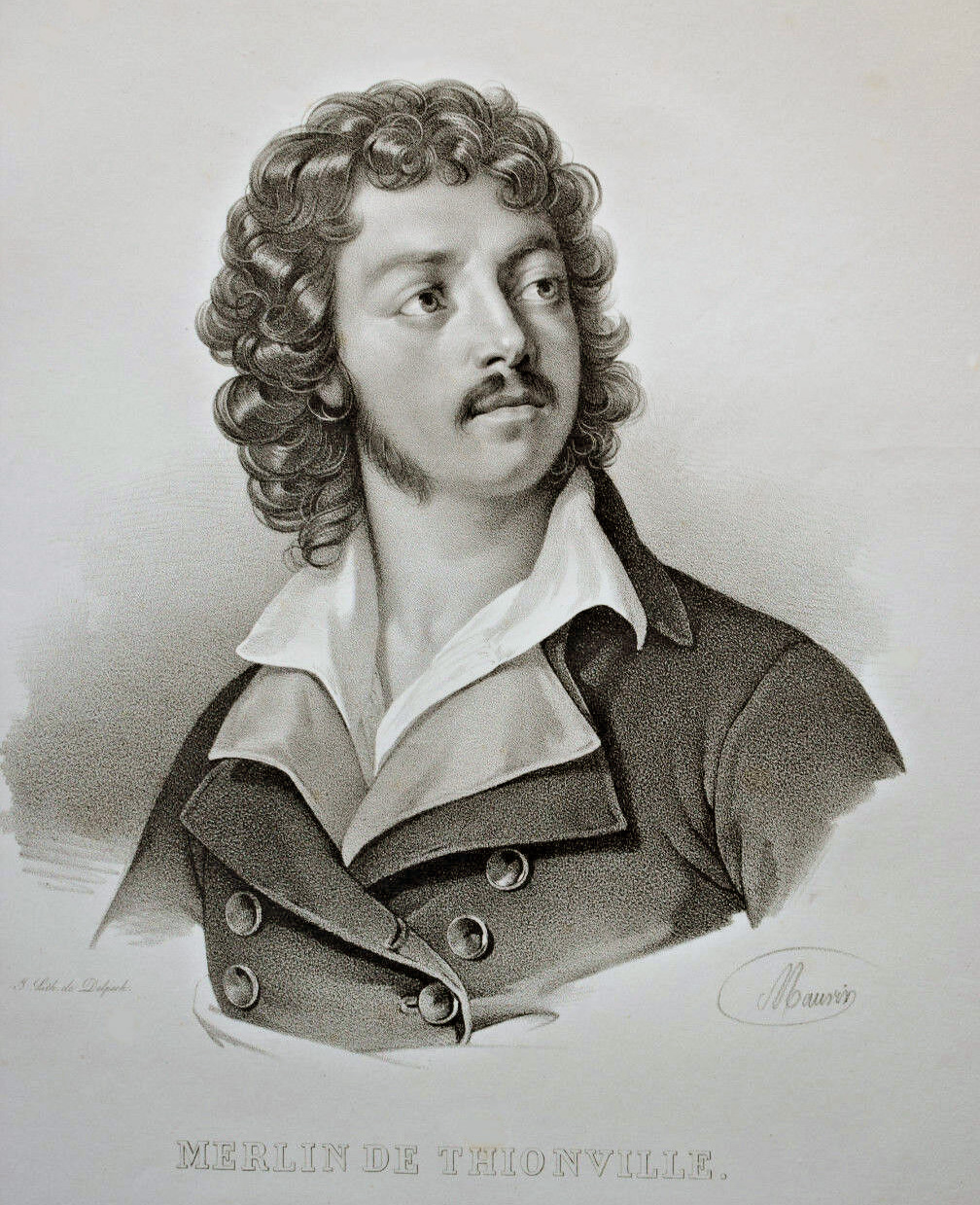
- Antoine Merlin de Thionville

49th President of the National Convention
- In office 20 May – 4 June 1794
- Preceded by: Philippe-Antoine Merlin de Douai
- Succeeded by: André Antoine Bernard

Personal details
- Born: 13 September 1762 Thionville, Moselle, Kingdom of France
- Died: 14 September 1833 (aged 71) Paris, France

Antoine Christophe Merlin (13 September 1762 in Thionville, Moselle – September 1833 in Paris) was a member of several legislative bodies during the era of the French Revolution. He is usually called Merlin de Thionville (Merlin of Thionville) to distinguish him from Philippe-Antoine Merlin de Douai.

== Life ==
He was born at Thionville, the son of a procureur in the bailliage of Thionville. After studying theology, he began a career in law, and in 1788 was an avocat at the parlement of Metz. In 1790 he was elected municipal officer of Thionville, and was sent by the department of Moselle to the Legislative Assembly. On 23 October 1791, he moved and carried the institution of a committee of surveillance, of which he became a member. It was he who proposed the law sequestrating the property of the émigrés, and he took an important part in the Demonstration of 20 June 1792 and in the revolution of 10 August of the same year.

He was elected deputy to the National Convention and pressed for the execution of Louis XVI, but a mission to the army prevented his attending the trial. He displayed great bravery in the defence of Mainz. He took part in the Thermidorian Reaction which brought about the fall of Maximilien Robespierre, and was appointed to the Committee of General Security on 31 July 1794. He sat in the Council of Five Hundred under the Directory, and at the Coup of 18 Fructidor (4 September 1797) demanded the deportation of certain republican members. In 1798, he ceased to be a member of the Council of Five Hundred and was appointed director-general of posts, being sent subsequently to organize the Army of Italy. He retired into private life at the proclamation of the Consulate, and lived in retirement under the Consulate and the First French Empire.

== Bibliografie ==
- 1828-1830 - Questions de droit qui se présentent le plus fréquemment dans les tribunaux. Tome premier, a.-app.; Tome deuxième, app-ban.; Tome troisième, bel.-com.; Tome quatrième, com.-cur.; Tome cinquième, dat.-dom.; Tome sixième, don.-epo.; Tome septième, err.-gru.; Tome huitième, hér.-ins.; Tome neuvième, ins.-mar.; Tome dixième, mar.-nul.; Tome onzième, obl.-pré.; Tome douzième, pre.-ren.; Tome treizième, ren.-rét.; Tome quatorzième, réu.-sub.; Tome cinquième, sub.--tes.; Tome seizième, tie.--wis.. Quatrième édition, revue, corrigée et considérablement augmentée

== See also ==
- The Legislative Assembly and the fall of the French monarchy
