= Alexis Chalbos =

French general (1736–1803)

- Born: 6 March 1736; Cubières, Gévaudan, Kingdom of France
- Died: 17 March 1803 (aged 67); Mainz, Germany
- Military career
- Allegiance: Kingdom of France; Republican France
- Branch: Army
- Service years: (Kingdom of France) 1751–1792 (France) 1792–1803
- Rank: General of Division
- Commands: Army of the West
- Conflicts: War in the Vendée; Battle of Fontenay-le-Comte; Second Battle of Châtillon; Battle of Cholet; Battle of Entrames
- Awards: Order of Saint Louis

Alexis François Chalbos (6 March 1736 – 17 March 1803) was a French general of the French Revolutionary Wars.

In 1751, he joined the Régiment de Normandie as a private. In June 1789, he was promoted to captain, then to general in 1793. He served largely in the War in the Vendée, for a short time succeeding Jean Léchelle as commander in chief of the Army of the West. He ended his career in command of the forces in the stronghold at Mainz.

== Sources ==
- Clerget, Charles (1905). Tableaux des Armées Françaises pendant les Guerres de la Révolution. Paris: Librarie Militaire R. Chapelot et Cie.
- Michelet, Jules. Histoire de la Révolution française. Vol. 1. ISBN 2-221-08884-0.

Military offices
Preceded by Jean Léchelle	Provisional Commander-in-chief of the Army of the West; 28 October–15 November 1793	Succeeded by Jean Antoine Rossignol
