= Army of Mainz =

French Revolutionary Army (1797–1799)

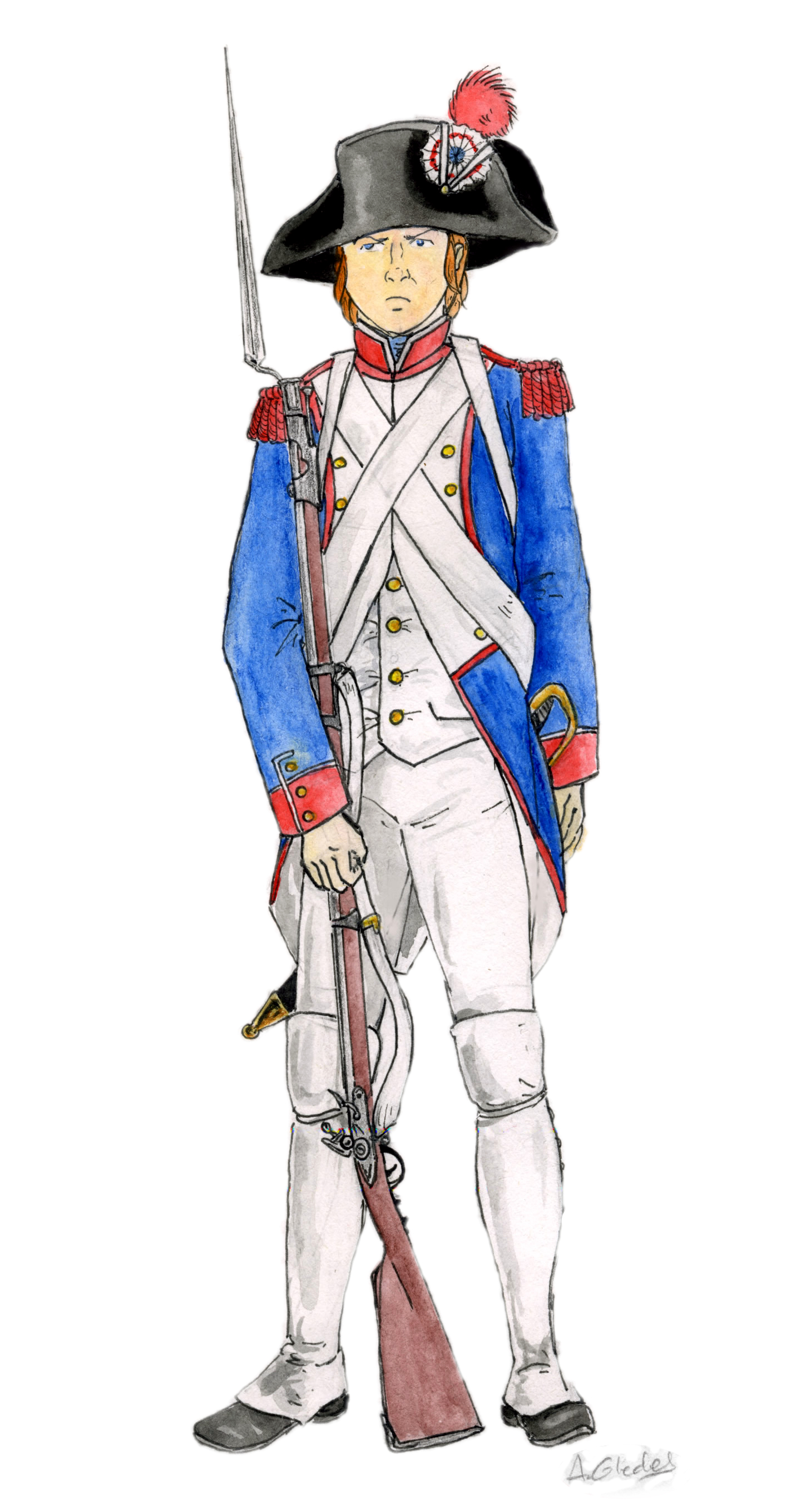
- Fusilier of a French Revolutionary Army
- Active: December 1797 – February 1799
- Country: France
- Allegiance: Republican France

Commanders
- Notable commanders: Jean-Baptiste Aubert du Bayet; Jacques Maurice Hatry; Barthélemy Catherine Joubert

The Army of Mainz or Army of Mayence (Armée de Mayence) was a French Revolutionary Army set up on 9 December 1797 by splitting the Army of Germany into the Army of Mayence and the Army of the Rhine. Part of it split off on 4 February 1799 to form the Army of Observation, though part of that army then re-merged as the Army of Mayence on 28 March that year. The remainder formed the Army of the Danube. In 1793, the French soldiers captured in the Siege of Mainz were paroled by the Prussians with the promise not to fight against the First Coalition for one year. As their parole conditions did not prohibit them from fighting French rebels in the interior, the troops were sent to fight in the War in the Vendée under the unofficial name "Army of Mayence". This body was absorbed into the Army of the West on 6 October 1793.

== Army of Mayence 1793 ==
Army of Mayence (or Mainz) was also the unofficial title of the 16,000-man garrison that surrendered on 23 July 1793 at the conclusion of the Siege of Mainz. They were paroled by the Prussian army on condition that they not fight against the First Coalition for one year. Army of the Rhine commander Alexandre de Beauharnais pointed out that the terms did not exclude them from fighting against French rebels inside France. Therefore, 14,000 troops from the garrison were sent to the War in the Vendée under Jean-Baptiste Annibal Aubert du Bayet, where they proved to be better soldiers than the poorly trained armies fighting there. The superiority of the Mainz corps was so evident that it provoked jealousy, and in November 1793 the force was broken up.

== Sources ==
- Clerget, Charles (1905). Tableaux des Armées Françaises pendant les Guerres de la Révolution. Paris: Librarie Militaire R. Chapelot et Cie.
- Phipps, Ramsay Weston (2011). The Armies of the First French Republic: Volume III The Armies in the West 1793 to 1797 And, The Armies In The South 1793 to March 1796. Vol. 3. USA: Pickle Partners Publishing. ISBN 978-1-908692-26-9.
