= François Séverin Marceau =

French general (1769–1796)

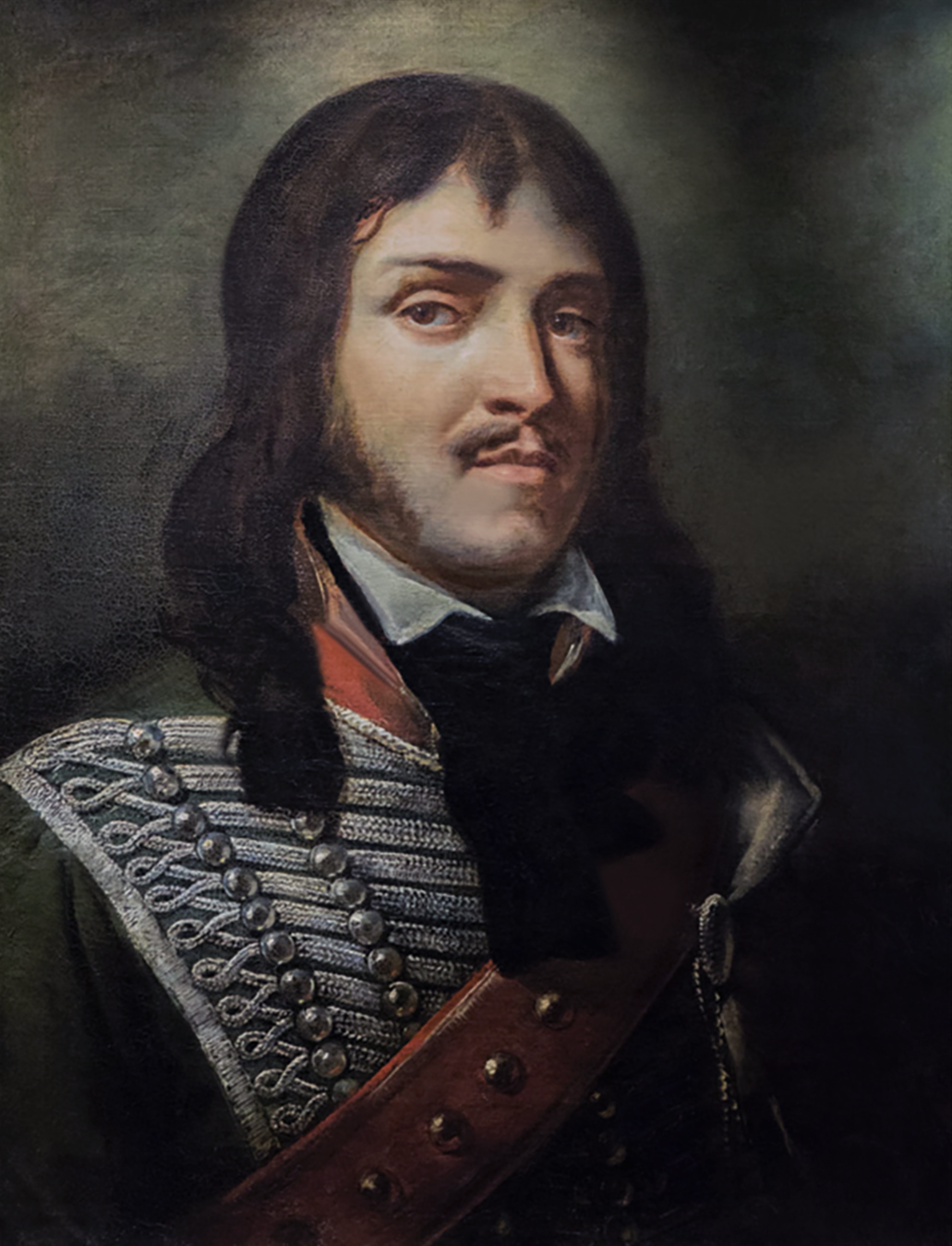
- General Marceau, by François Bouchot, Musée de l'armée
- Born: 1 March 1769; Chartres, Kingdom of France
- Died: 21 September 1796 (aged 27); Altenkirchen, Holy Roman Empire
- Burial place: Panthéon, Paris
- Military career
- Allegiance: Kingdom of France; Kingdom of France; French Republic
- Service years: 1785–1796
- Rank: Divisional general
- Commands: Armée de l'Ouest; Fortress of Mainz
- Conflicts: French Revolutionary Wars
- Awards: Names inscribed on the Arc de Triomphe
- Other work: Minister of War

François Séverin Marceau-Desgraviers (English: /mɑːrˈsoʊ/ mar-SOH, French: [fʁɑ̃swa sevʁɛ̃ maʁso deɡʁavje]; 1 March 1769 – 21 September 1796) was a French general of the Revolutionary Wars.

== Early life ==
Desgraviers was born on 1 March 1769 in Chartres, in the province of Orléanais, the son of a prosecutor. In December 1785, at the age of 16, he enlisted in the Angoulême Infantry Regiment, which later became the 34th Infantry Regiment of the French Army. While on furlough in Paris, Marceau participated in the storming of the Bastille on 14 July 1789. After that event he took his discharge from the regular army and returned to Chartres, but the opposition of his family soon compelled him to seek new military employment.

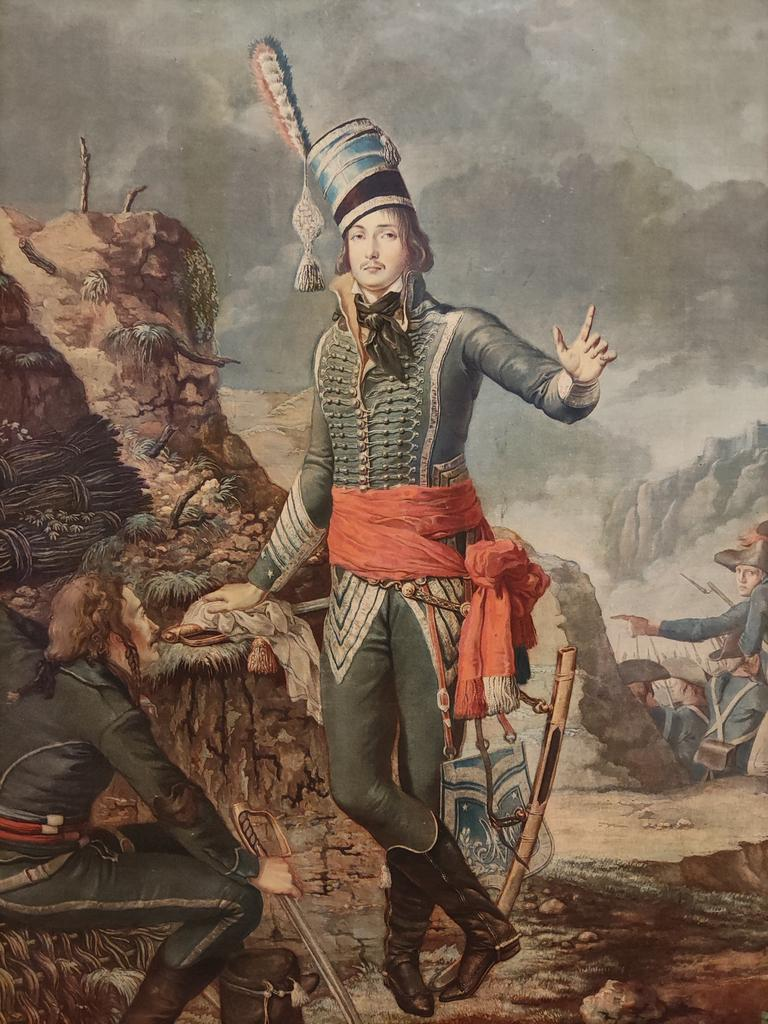
Portrait by Marceau's brother-in-law, Antoine Sergent, 1798 (Musée de la Révolution française)

== Revolutionary Wars ==
In July 1792, Marceau was appointed captain of the Revolutionary Army's 2nd Battalion of Volunteers of Eure-et-Loir. He took part in the defence of Verdun later in the year, and it was his troop that was ordered to bear the proposals of capitulation to the Prussian camp. The defenders' lack of morale provoked the anger of the revolutionary authorities, and Marceau was fortunate to find re-employment as a captain in the regular service. However, early in 1793, he along with other officers under suspicion was arrested and imprisoned for a period.

=== Vendée ===
On his release, Marceau hurried to take part in the defence of Saumur against the Vendéean Royalists, distinguishing himself at the Battle of Saumur on 10 June 1793 by rescuing the representative Pierre Bourbotte from the hands of the insurgents. The National Convention voted him the thanks of the country and he received rapid promotion. His conduct at the Battle of Chantonnay on 5 September 1793 won him the provisional rank of general of brigade. On 17 October, he bore a great part in the victory at the Battle of Cholet, and began his friendship with Jean Baptiste Kléber while on the field of battle.

Kléber was made a general of division, and Marceau confirmed as general of brigade. Marceau in turn became a général de division on 10 November; then succeeded to the commander-in-chief ad interim. With Kléber, he crushed the Vendean rebels at the Battle of Le Mans on 12–13 December and at the Battle of Savenay on 23 December 1793.

In the wake of Le Mans, Marceau had rescued and protected a young Royalist lady, Angélique des Mesliers, with whom it has been supposed Marceau fell in love – however, even his help could not save her from the guillotine.

He and Kléber themselves were saved from arrest and execution only by the intervention of Bourbotte. Around this time Marceau became engaged to Agathe Leprêtre de Châteaugiron, but the marriage was prevented by his constant military employment, his broken health and the opposition of both Auguste-Félicité Le Prestre de Châteaugiron and Marceau's devoted half-sister Emira, wife of the Republican politician Antoine Joseph Sergent.

=== Battles of 1795–96 ===
After spending the winter of 1793–94 in Paris, Marceau accepted a command in the army under Jean-Baptiste Jourdan alongside Kléber and took part in the various battles near Charleroi. During the battle of Fleurus on 26 June 1794 he had a horse shot from under him. He distinguished himself at Jülich, at Aldenhoven and at Koblenz, where he stormed the enemy lines on 23 October.

He took part in the 1795-1796 campaign with the armies of the Sambre and Meuse, fighting on the Rhine and the Lahn and distinguishing himself alongside Kléber and future king of Sweden and marshal of France Charles XIV John (Jean-Baptiste Bernadotte) near Neuwied and Sulzbach.

He became a close companion of Jean Baptiste Bernadotte and they shared many victories, often working together as an effective duo. At Neuwied he held Kléber and Bernadotte's rear, going so far as to threaten to "shoot himself from mortification" if his men were to fail to hold. It was effective, and the retreat was successful.

=== Death ===
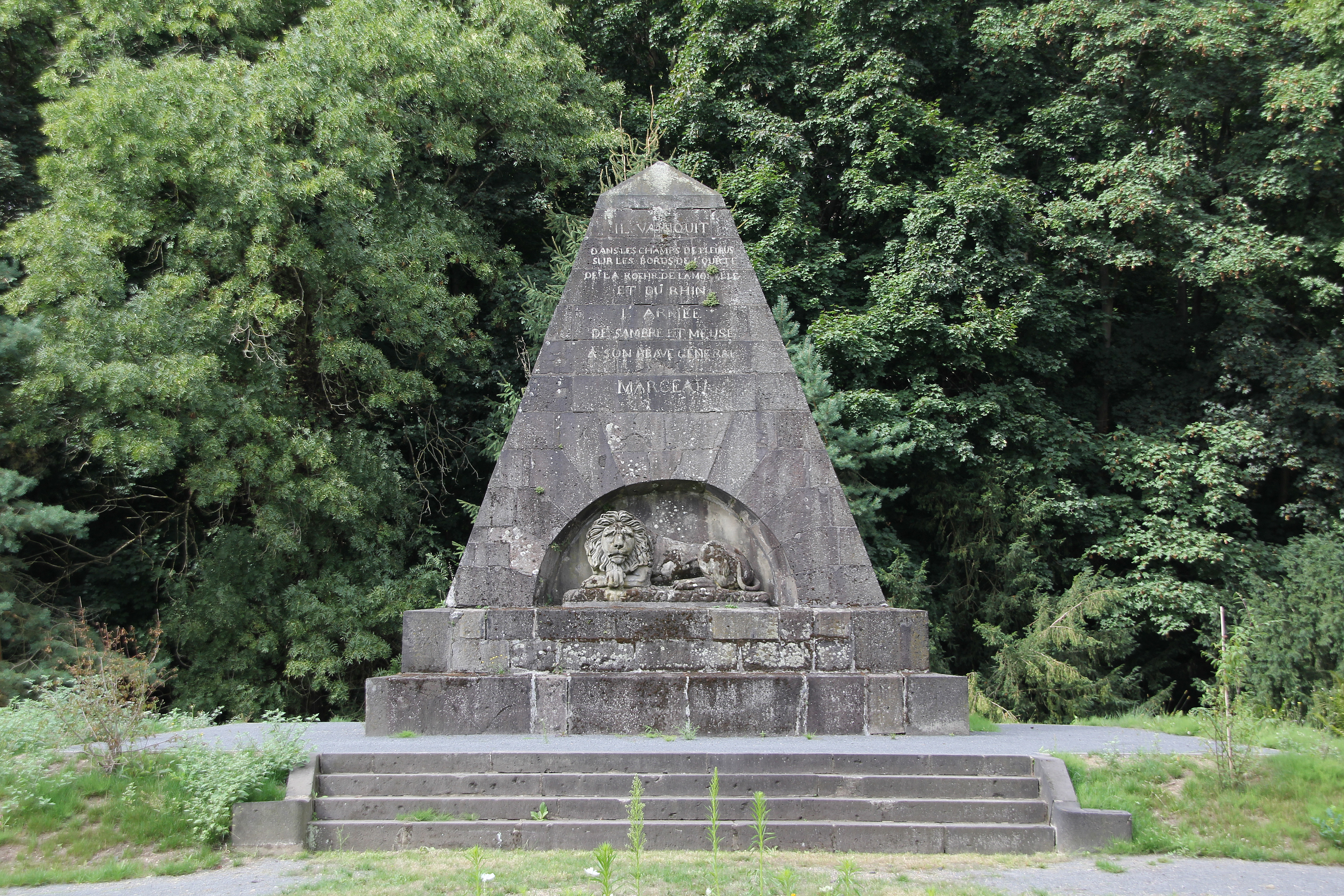
Tomb of Desgraviers-Marceau in Koblenz

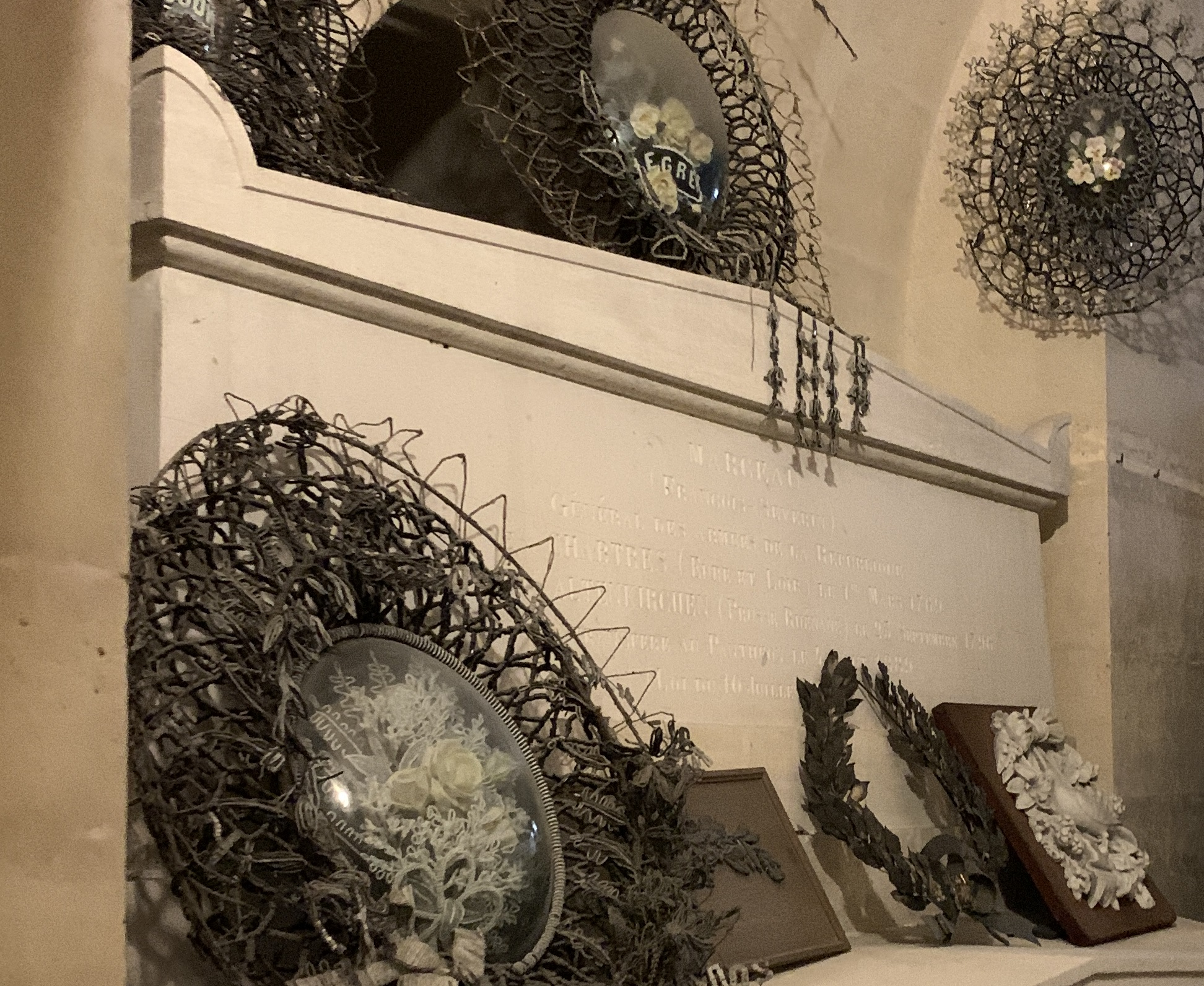
Tomb of Desgraviers-Marceau in the Panthéon, Paris

After Jourdan and Jean Victor Marie Moreau's Rhine Campaign of 1796 ended in defeat, Marceau's men covered Jourdan's retreat over the Rhine. Marceau fought in the desperate Battle of Limburg on the Lahn River (16–19 September 1796). While conducting a successful rear guard action near Altenkirchen on 19 September, he received a mortal wound. He died two days later in the early morning, aged only twenty-seven.

The Austrians competed with Marceau's own countrymen to honour the dead general. His body was burned and the ashes placed under a pyramid in Koblenz designed by Kléber. They were transferred to the Panthéon in 1889.

Marceau was immortalized in Lord Byron's Childe Harold's Pilgrimage:

LVI

By Coblentz, on a rise of gentle ground,
There is a small and simple pyramid,
Crowning the summit of the verdant mound;
Beneath its base are heroes' ashes hid,
Our enemy's – but let not that forbid
Honour to Marceau! o'er whose early tomb
Tears, big tears, gush'd from the rough soldier's lid,
Lamenting and yet envying such a doom,
Falling for France, whose rights he battled to resume.

LVII

Brief, brave, and glorious was his young career, —
His mourners were two hosts, his friends and foes;
And fitly may the stranger lingering here
Pray for his gallant spirit's bright repose;
For he was Freedom's champion, one of those,
The few in number, who had not o'erstept
The charter to chastise which she bestows
On such as wield her weapons; he had kept
The whiteness of his soul, and thus men o'er him wept.
