= Jean-Baptiste Kléber =

French army officer and architect (1753–1800)

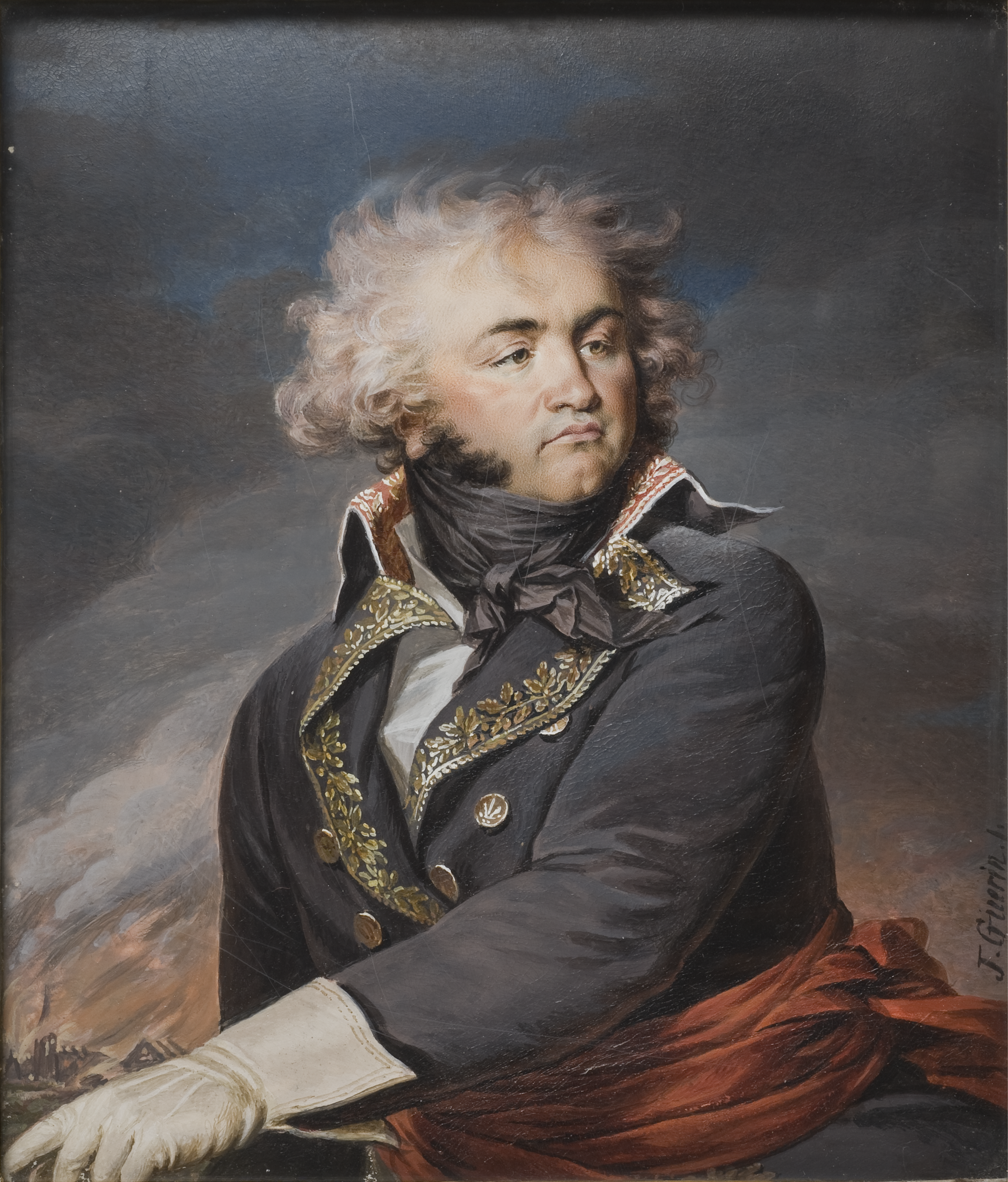
- Portrait by Jean-Urbain Guérin, 1798
- Born: 9 March 1753; Strasbourg, France
- Died: 14 June 1800 (aged 47); Cairo, Ottoman Egypt
- Burial place: Place Kléber, Strasbourg
- Military career
- Allegiance: Kingdom of France; Holy Roman Empire; French First Republic
- Branch: French Royal Army; Imperial Army; French Revolutionary Army
- Service years: 1769–1770 (France); 1777–1783 (HRE); 1792–1800 (France)
- Rank: Divisional general
- Commands: 4th Haute-Rhin Battalion; Army of Sambre and Meuse; Army of the Orient
- Conflicts: See list: War of the Bavarian Succession; French Revolutionary Wars; War in the Vendée; Battle of Tiffauges; Battle of Montaigu; Battle of La Tremblaye; Second Battle of Cholet; Virée de Galerne; Battle of Dol; Battle of Le Mans; Battle of Savenay; War of the First Coalition; Siege of Mainz; Flanders Campaign; Battle of Gosselies; Battle of Fleurus; Siege of Maastricht; Battle of the Roer; Battle of Mainz; Rhine Campaign of 1796; Battle of Siegburg; Battle of Altenkirchen; Battle of Kircheib; Battle of Friedberg; French campaign in Egypt and Syria; Siege of El Arish; Siege of Jaffa; Siege of Acre; Battle of Mount Tabor; Battle of Heliopolis
- Awards: Inscription on the Arc de Triomphe (Southern Pillar, Column 23)

Divisional-General Jean-Baptiste Kléber (French pronunciation: [ʒɑ̃ batist klebɛʁ]; 9 March 1753 – 14 June 1800) was a French army officer and architect who served in the War of the Bavarian Succession and French Revolutionary Wars. After serving for one year in the French Royal Army, he joined the Imperial Army of the Holy Roman Emperor seven years later. However, his humble birth hindered his opportunities. Eventually, Kléber joined the French Revolutionary Army in 1792 and quickly rose through the ranks.

Serving in the Rhineland during the War of the First Coalition, he also suppressed the Vendée Revolt. Kléber retired to private life in the peaceful interim after the Treaty of Campo Formio, but returned to military service to accompany Napoleon in the French invasion of Egypt in 1798. As the invasion started to suffer setbacks, Napoleon returned to Paris in 1799 and appointed Kléber as commander of all French forces in Egypt. He was assassinated by Suleiman al-Halabi, a Syrian theology student, in Cairo in 1800. Kléber, in times of peace, designed a number of buildings.

== Early career ==
Jean-Baptiste Kléber was born on 9 March 1753 in Strasbourg, in the province of Alsace, where his father worked as a master builder. In 1769, he enlisted in the French Royal Army's Bercheny's Hussar Regiment, but resigned in 1770 to study architecture for four years, part of which occurred in Paris with Jean-François Chalgrin. His opportune assistance to two German nobles in a tavern brawl obtained for him nomination to the military school of Munich. From this education, he obtained a commission in the Kaunitz Infantry Regiment Nr. 38 of the Imperial Army of the Holy Roman Emperor. He took part in the War of the Bavarian Succession but did not see major engagements. He was stationed alternately in the garrisons of Mons, Mechelen, and Luxembourg in the Austrian Netherlands. Finding that his humble birth hindered his chances for promotion beyond that of an unterleutnant, he left the Austrian army in 1783 after serving seven years.

=== Architecture ===
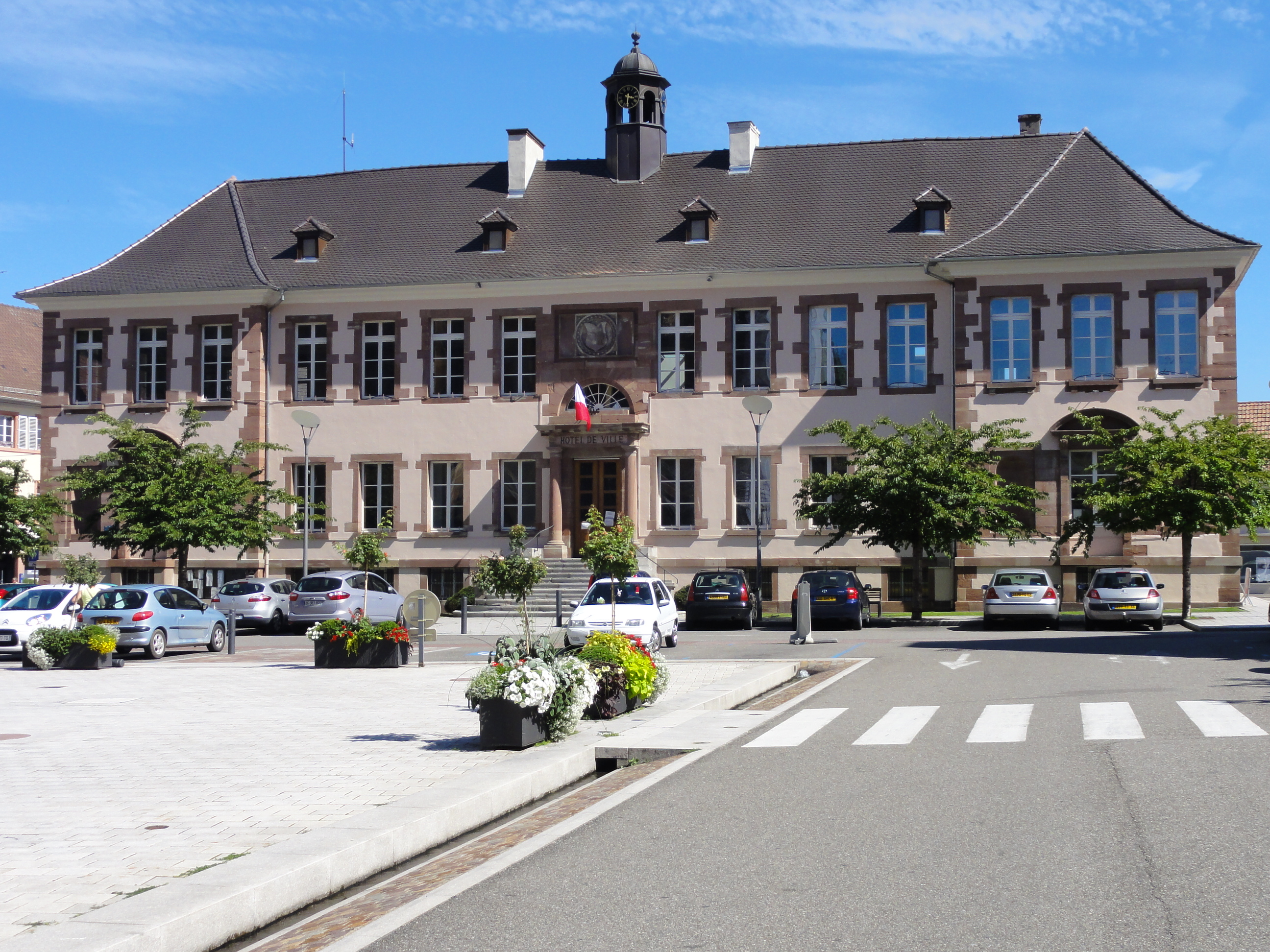
The Hôtel de Ville, Thann, which Kléber designed

On returning to France, Kléber received the appointment of inspector of public buildings at Belfort. Between 1784 and 1792, he designed a number of buildings both on public and private commission. Perhaps the most notable is the Hôtel de Ville at Thann, Haut-Rhin (1787–1793), which was originally designed as a hospital but turned into an administrative building before its completion. Other surviving buildings are the château of Grandvillars (often erroneously spelled "Granvillars"), built around 1790 and the canoness houses of the Benedictine abbey of Masevaux (1781–1790). Nine of these houses had been planned but due to the French Revolution, only seven were built. The Musée historique de Strasbourg features a room dedicated to Jean-Baptiste Kléber that also displays a number of his sketches and architectural designs.

== French Revolutionary Wars ==
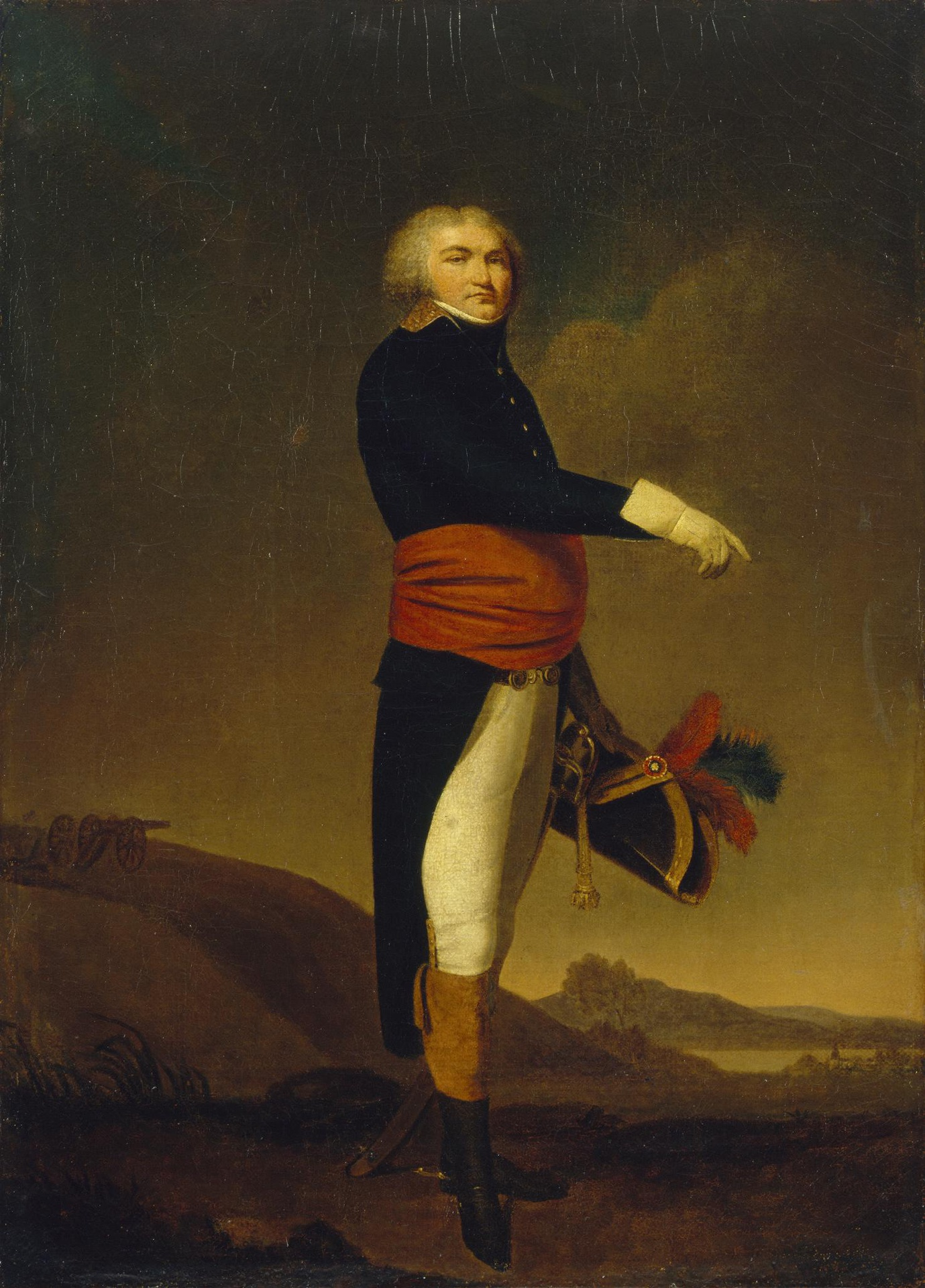
1793–1796 portrait of Kléber by Louis-Léopold Boilly

In 1792, at the start of the French Revolutionary Wars, Kléber enlisted in the 4th Battalion of Volunteers of Haut-Rhin. Thanks to his military experience, he was at once elected adjutant and soon afterward lieutenant-colonel of the battalion. At the defense of Mainz in July 1793 he so distinguished himself that, though disgraced along with the rest of the garrison and imprisoned, he promptly won reinstatement, and was promoted to brigade general in August 1793.

Kléber was then posted to the Army of the Coasts of La Rochelle and deployed to Western France, where he took part in the suppression of the Revolt in the Vendée. Although beaten at the Battle of Tiffauges on 19 September 1793, he maintained good relations with the representatives on mission and managed to keep his command. A month later, Kléber contributed to the Republican victory at Cholet, earning him his promotion to divisional general on 17 October 1793. In these operations began his intimacy with General François Marceau, with whom he defeated the Royalists at the battles of Le Mans and Savenay in December 1793.

When Kléber openly expressed his opinion that the Vendéans merited lenient measures, the authorities recalled him, but reinstated him once more in April 1794 and sent him to the Army of the Ardennes. He displayed his skill and bravery in the numerous actions around Charleroi, and especially in the crowning victory at Fleurus (26 June 1794). During the following years he served mostly in the Army of Sambre and Meuse on the Rhine frontier. In the winter of 1794–1795 he besieged Mainz. In 1795, and again in 1796, Kléber held the chief command of the army temporarily, but declined a permanent appointment as commander-in-chief.

On 13 October 1795 he fought a brilliant rearguard action at the bridge of Neuwied, and in the offensive campaign of 1796, he served as General Jean-Baptiste Jourdan's most active and successful lieutenant, with his victory at Siegburg on 1 June that year enabling Jourdan to get the bulk of the French force across the Rhine. After the retreat to the Rhine, Kléber again declined a chief command, and retired into private life in early 1798. He returned to service later that year, first in the Army of England, then accepted a division in the Army of the Orient under General Napoleon Bonaparte.

=== Egyptian campaign ===
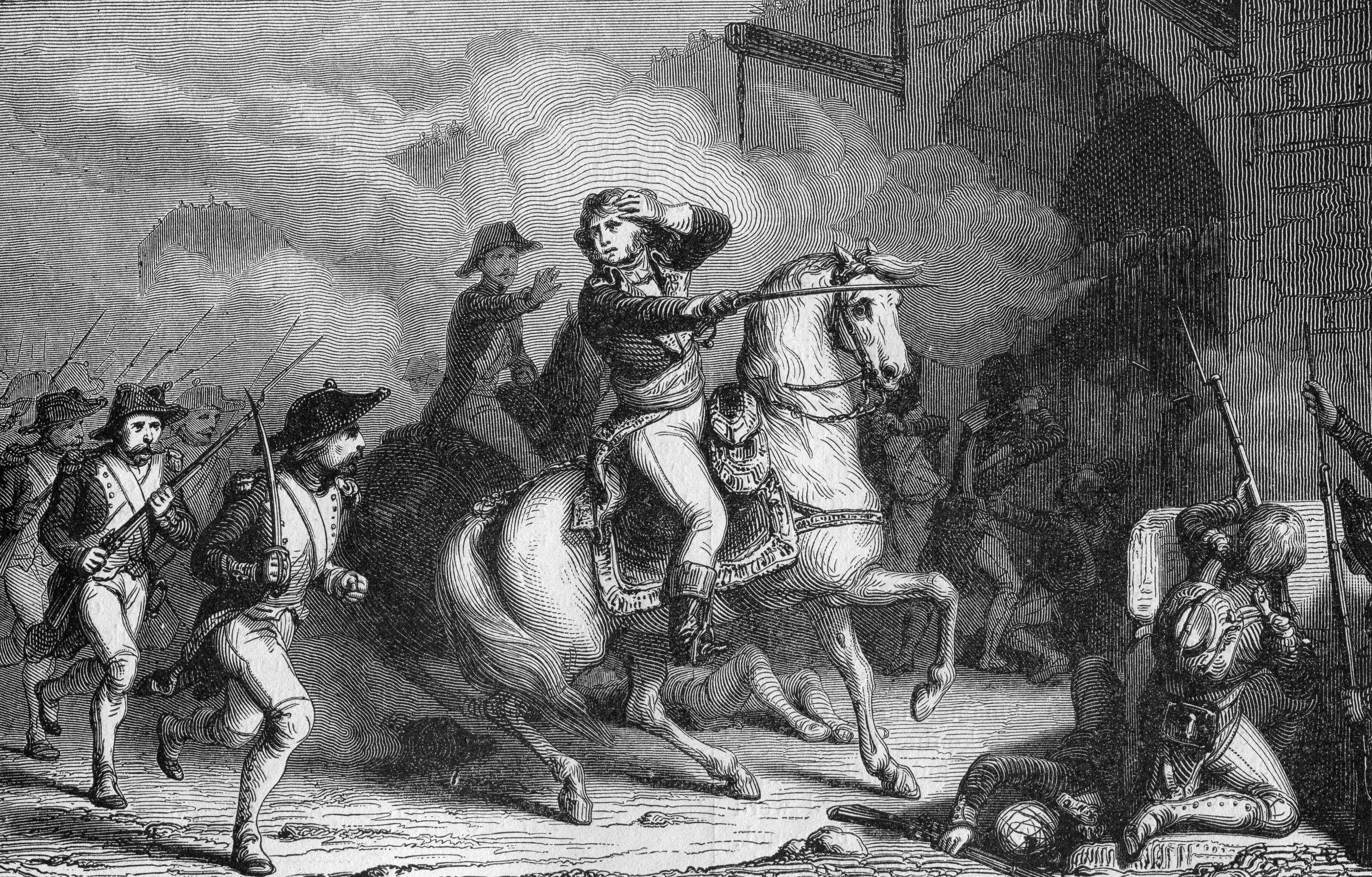
A wounded Kléber during the capture of Alexandria on 3 July 1798

Kléber followed Bonaparte in his invasion of Egypt but suffered a wound in the head in the first engagement at Alexandria, which prevented him for taking part in the Battle of the Pyramids, and caused his appointment as governor of Alexandria. In the Syrian campaign of 1799, however, he commanded the vanguard, took El-Arish, Gaza, and Jaffa, and won a great victory at the Battle of Mount Tabor on 15–16 April 1799.

The campaign was not going well for the French as Napoleon withdrew and returned to France towards the end of 1799. Napoleon left Kléber in command of the French forces, without consulting Kléber before leaving. In this capacity, seeing no hope of bringing his army back to France or of consolidating his conquests, he signed the Convention of El Arish with Kör Yusuf Ziyaüddin Pasha on 24 January 1800. Signed in Commodore Sidney Smith's presence, the convention allowed the Army of the Orient to return to Europe. However, the Pitt ministry had forbidden British commanders from going along with such a treaty, and both Smith and his superior Admiral Lord Keith wrote letters to Kléber informing him that their government would only accept an unconditional French surrender. An infuriated Kléber proceeded to attack and defeat an Ottoman army of 60,000 men at the Battle of Heliopolis. Although he had only 10,000 men against 60,000 Turks, Kléber's forces utterly defeated the Ottomans on 20 March 1800. He then returned to Cairo and suppressed another revolt against French rule.

Kléber, son of an operative? freemason and a prominent mason himself, was attestedly instrumental in bringing freemasonry to Egypt. While he was negotiating with Sidney Smith in January 1800, Kléber opened a masonic temple in Cairo and thus created the Isis lodge (La Loge Isis), serving as its first master. The motto of the lodge was the slogan of the French Revolution: Liberté, égalité, fraternité.

=== Assassination ===
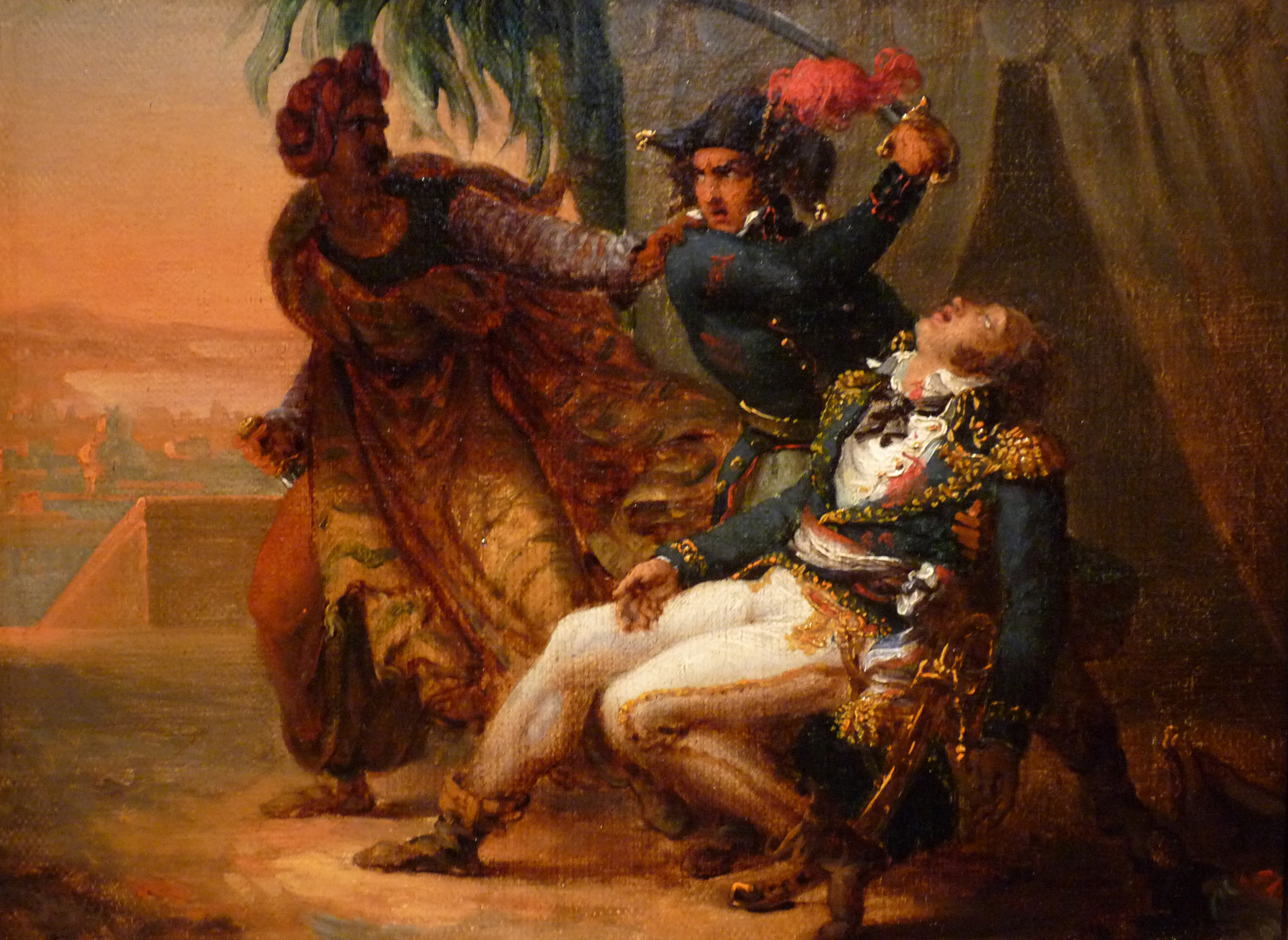
Painting of Kléber's assassination

Shortly after these victories, while Kléber was walking in the garden of the palace of Alfi bika, he was stabbed to death by Suleiman al-Halabi, a Kurdish. The assassin appeared to be begging from Kléber, but then took his hand and stabbed him in the heart, stomach, left arm, and right cheek, before running away to hide near the palace. He was soon caught, still in possession of the dagger which he had used to kill Kléber, and was later executed. The assassination happened in Cairo on 14 June 1800, coincidentally the same day on which Kléber's friend and comrade, Desaix, fell at Marengo. The assassin's right arm was burned off, and he was impaled in a public square in Cairo and left for several hours to die. Suleiman's skull was shipped to France and used to teach medical students what the French phrenologists claimed were the cranial features indicating "crime" and "fanaticism".

=== Burial ===
After his assassination, Kléber's embalmed body was repatriated to France. Fearing that his tomb would become a symbol of Republicanism, Napoleon ordered it held at the Château d'If, on an island near Marseille. It stayed there for 18 years until Louis XVIII granted Kléber a burial place in his home town of Strasbourg. He was buried on 15 December 1838 in the Strasbourg Cathedral, before being transferred in 1840 below his statue located in the center of Place Kléber. His heart is in an urn in the caveau of the Governors beneath the altar of the Saint Louis Chapel in Les Invalides, Paris. Kléber's name is inscribed in column 23 on the southern pillar of the Arc de Triomphe.

== Assessment ==
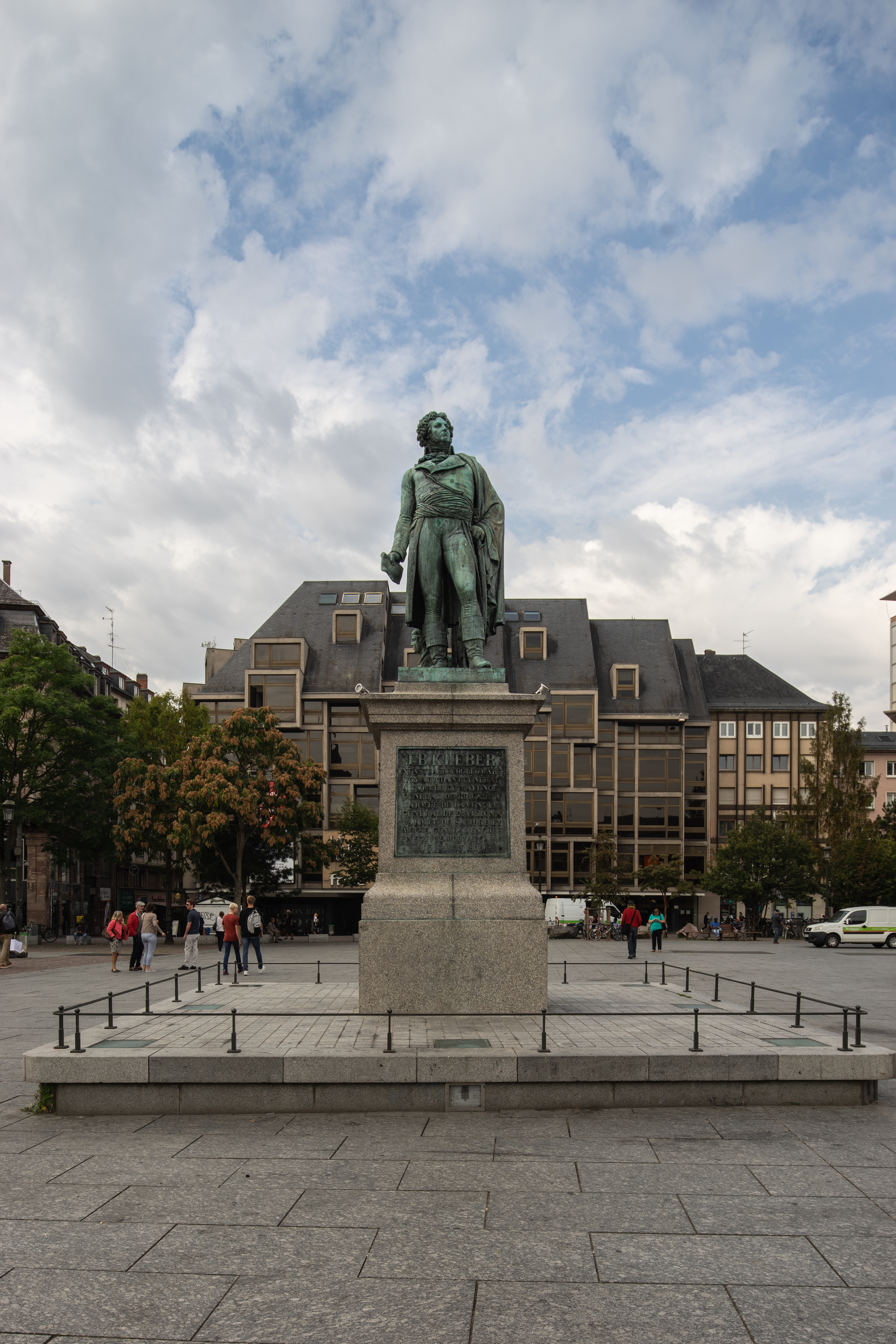
Statue of Kléber at the Place Kléber, Strasbourg

Kléber emerged as undoubtedly one of the greatest generals of the French revolutionary epoch. Though he distrusted his powers and declined the responsibility of supreme command, there is nothing in his career to show that he would have been unequal to it. As a second-in-command no general of his time excelled him. His conduct of affairs in Egypt, at a time when the treasury was empty and the troops were discontented for want of pay, shows that his powers as an administrator were little, if at all, inferior to those he possessed as a general. While Kléber himself had a mixed view of Napoleon (including cursing at him and drawing mocking caricatures of him), Bonaparte thought highly of Kléber's skill, stating that there was, "No sight so splendid as watching Kléber go into battle", and he likened him to the God of War Mars.

== See also ==
- Lycée Kléber
- Place Kléber
- Kléber (Paris Métro)
- Kléber (train)
- Manfred Stern, Soviet officer who gained fame in the Spanish Civil War under the pseudonym "General Kléber"

== Notes ==
Attribution:
