= Capture of Alexandria (1798) =

1798 battle of the French invasion of Egypt and Syria

Coordinates: 31°11′53″N 29°55′9″E

- Part of the French invasion of Egypt and Syria
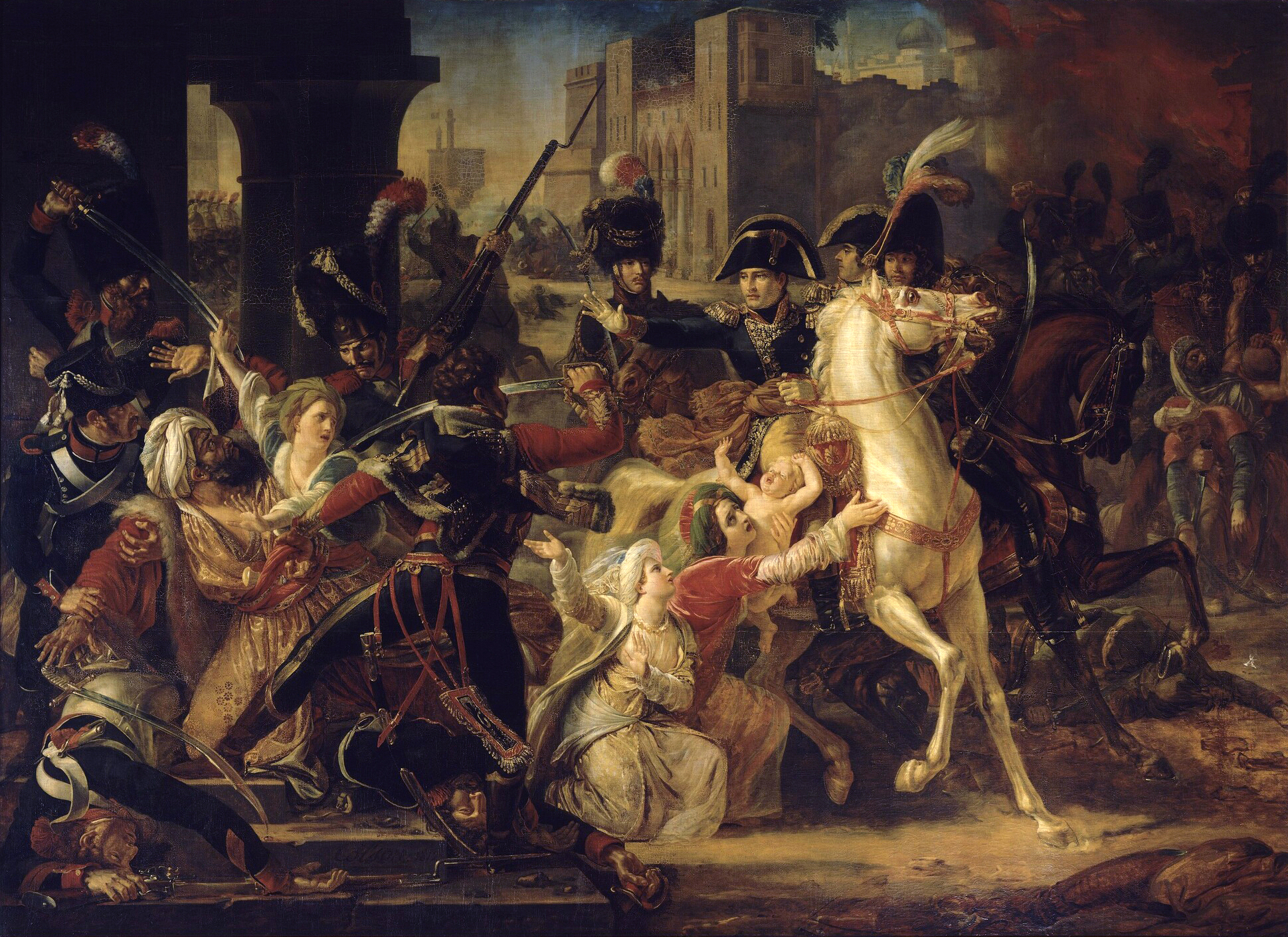
- Entry of General Bonaparte into Alexandria by Guillaume-François Colson, 1812
Date	2–3 July 1798
Location	Alexandria, Ottoman Egypt
Result	French victory

Belligerents
France	Ottoman Empire

Commanders and leaders
Napoleon Bonaparte; Jean-Baptiste Kléber	Mohammed El-Koraïm

Strength
5,000	500

Casualties and losses
300 killed or wounded	Unknown

The capture of Alexandria was the first operation on Egyptian soil during the French invasion of Egypt and Syria. On 2 July 1798, the French army landed and took the city of Alexandria from the hands of the Janissaries.

== Background ==
Napoleon Bonaparte departed Malta for Egypt. After successfully eluding detection by the Royal Navy for thirteen days, the fleet was in sight of Alexandria where it landed on 1 July, although Napoleon's plan had been to land elsewhere. On the day of the landing, Napoleon told his troops "I promise to each soldier who returns from this expedition, enough to purchase six arpents of land." (approximately 7.6 acres or 3.1 ha) and added:

The peoples we will be living alongside are Muslims; their first article of faith is "There is no other god but God, and Mahomet is his prophet". Do not contradict them; treat them as you treated the Jews, the Italians; respect their muftis and their imams, as you respected their rabbis and bishops. Have the same tolerance for the ceremonies prescribed by the Quran, for their mosques, as you had for the convents, for the synagogues, for the religion of Moses and that of Jesus Christ. The Roman legions used to protect all religions. You will here find different customs to those of Europe, you must get accustomed to them. The people among whom we are going treat women differently to us; but in every country whoever violates one is a monster. Pillaging only enriches a small number of men; it dishonours us, it destroys our resources; it makes enemies of the people who it is in our interest to have as our friends. The first city we will encounter was built by Alexander the Great. We shall find at every step great remains worthy of exciting French emulation.

On 1 July, Napoleon, aboard the ship Orient en route to Egypt, wrote the following proclamation to the Muslim inhabitants of Alexandria:

For too long the beys who govern Egypt have insulted the French nation and covered their traders in slanders. The hour of their punishment has come. For too long this horde of slaves, bought in the Caucasus and Georgia, have tyrannised the most beautiful part of the world; but God, on whom all depends, has ordained that their empire shall end. People of Egypt, they have told you that I come to destroy your religion, but do not believe it; [tell them] in reply [that] I come to restore your rights, punish the usurpers and that I respect God, his prophet and the Quran more than the Mamluks. Tell them that all men are equal before God; wisdom, talents, virtues are the only things to make one man different from another... Is there a more beautiful land? It belongs to the Mamluks. If Egypt is their farm, then they should show the lease that God gave them for it... Cadis, cheiks, imans, tchorbadjis, and notables of the nation [I ask you to] tell the people that we are true friends of Muslims. Wasn't it us who destroyed the Knights of Malta? Wasn't it us who destroyed the Pope who used to say that he had a duty to make war on Muslims? Wasn't it us who have at all times been friends to the Great Lord and enemies to his enemies? ... Thrice happy are those who will be with us! They shall prosper in their fortune and in their rank. Happy are those who will be neutral! They will get to know us over time, and join their ranks with ours. But unhappy, thrice unhappy, are those who shall arm themselves [to fight] for the Mamluks and who shall fight against us! There shall be no hope for them, they shall perish.

Despite the idealistic promises proclaimed by Napoleon, Egyptian intellectuals like 'Abd al-Rahman al-Jabarti (1753–1825 C.E/ 1166–1240 A.H) were heavily critical of Napoleon's objectives. As a major chronicler of the French invasion, Jabarti decried the French invasion of Egypt as the start of:

"fierce fights and important incidents; of the momentous mishaps and appalling afflictions, of the multiplication of malice and the acceleration of affairs; of successive sufferings and turning times; of the inversion of the innate and the elimination of the established; of horrors upon horrors and contradicting conditions; of the perversion of all precepts and the onset of annihilation; of the dominance of destruction and the occurrence of occasions"

Jacques-François Menou had been the first to set out for Egypt, and was the first Frenchman to land. Napoleon and Kléber landed together and joined Menou at night at the cove of Marabout (Citadel of Qaitbay), on which the first drapeau tricolore to be hoisted in Egypt was raised.

== Battle ==
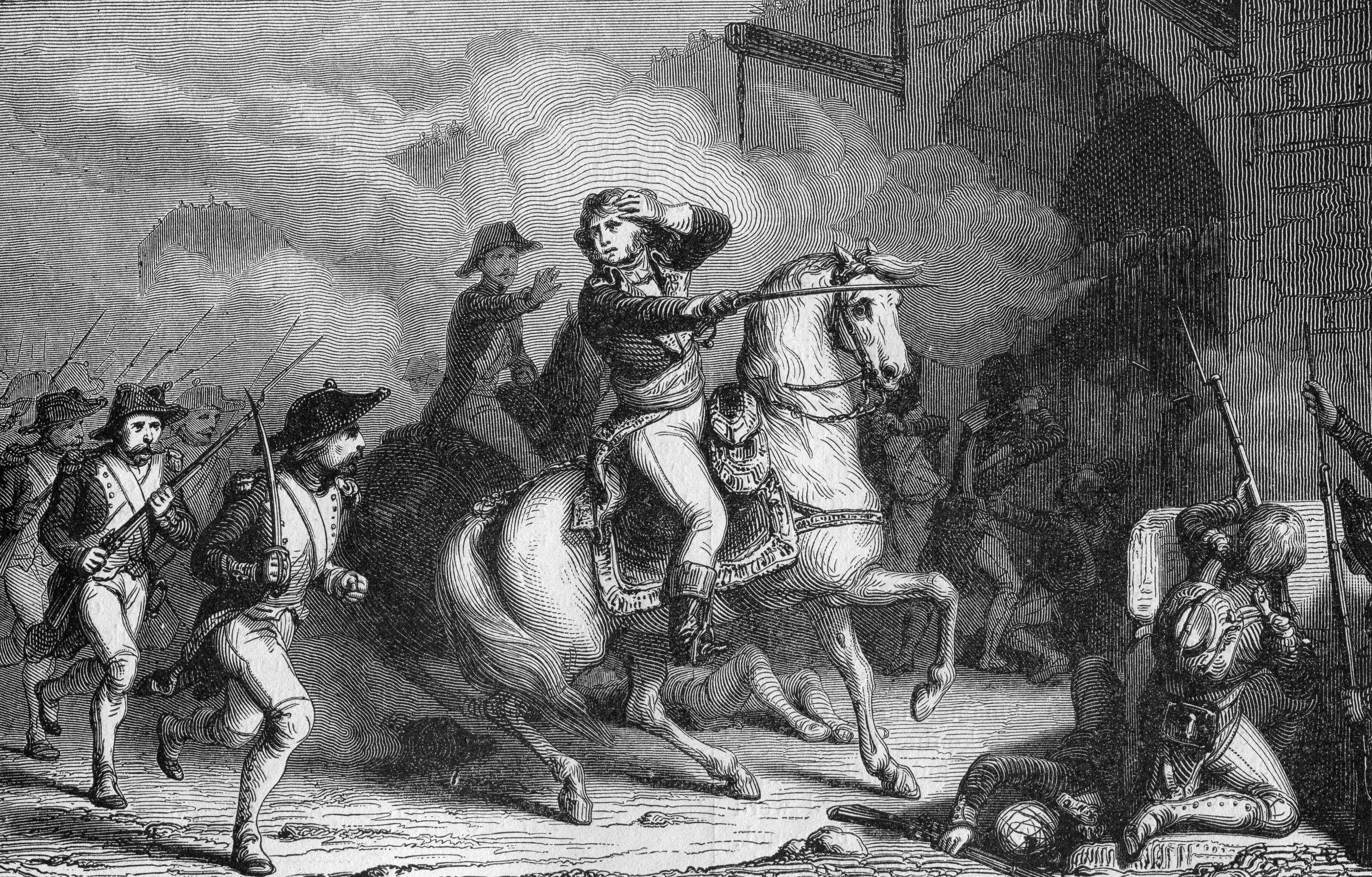
General Jean-Baptiste Kléber wounded in front of Alexandria (1870 engraving)

On the night of 2 July 1798, 7,000 French troops landed in Marabout cove at 13 of the city. Without waiting for artillery or cavalry whose swell delayed the landing, Napoleon marched at night on the city at the head of 4,000-5,000 men. The French attempt at talks is greeted by a shootout. Faced with the very poor state of the fortifications, Napoleon decided to order the assault without waiting for the artillery.

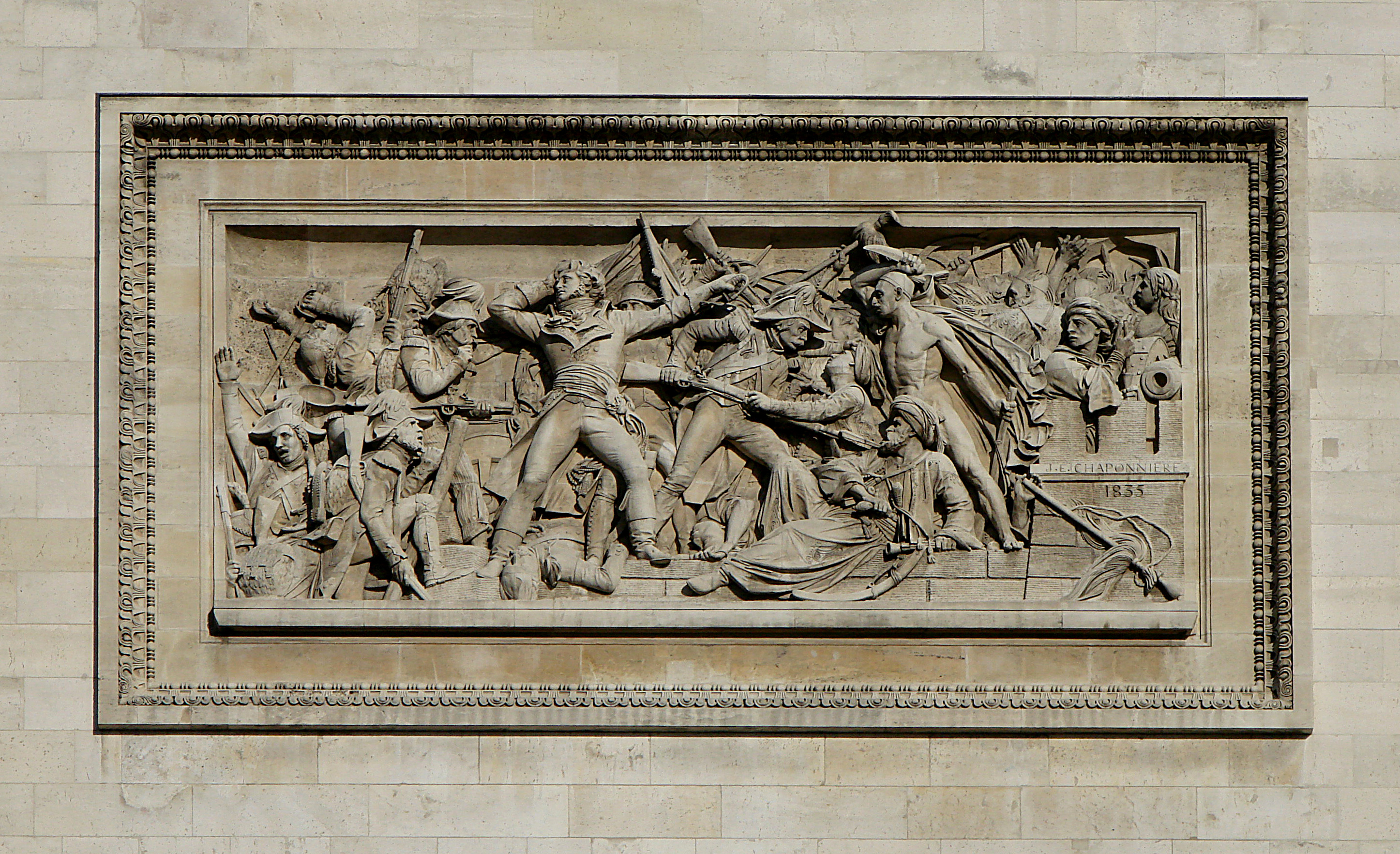
Relief on the Arc de Triomphe depicting the capture of Alexandria

The French are divided into three columns. On the left, Menou attacks the “triangular fort” and receives seven wounds. Kléber in the center and Louis André Bon on the right attack the city gates. Kléber received a bullet in the forehead but was only wounded and after a fairly sharp shootout in the city, the French took control of Alexandria. During the battle, angered from being shot at by local civilians, French troops engaged in several atrocities against civilian residents of Alexandria. After being shot at from one of the city's mosques, the French entered the mosque and bayonetted anyone they found inside.

== Aftermath ==
After the capture of the city, the French expeditionary force benefited from a base of operations. However, the state of disrepair of the city as well as the desert aspect of the surrounding area pushed the French army to move quickly inland. While he marched towards the Nile, Napoleon left in Alexandria a garrison of 2,000 men under the orders of Kléber, who was convalescing, while Menou took command of Rosetta.

== Sources ==
- Jacques Bainville (1997). Bonaparte en Égypte (in French). Paris: Balland. ISBN 2-7158-1135-7.
- Digby Smith (1998). The Greenhill Napoleonic Wars Data Book. Londra: Greenhill Books. ISBN 1-85367-276-9.
- Jean Tulard (1999). Dictionnaire Napoléon (in French). Vol. A–H. Paris: Fayard. ISBN 2-213-60485-1.
- Jean Tulard (1999). Dictionnaire Napoléon (in French). Paris: Fayard. ISBN 2-213-60485-1.
- Jean-Joël, Brégeon (1998). L'Égypte de Bonaparte. Perrin. ISBN 2-262-01392-6.
- Jean-Joël, Brégeon (2002). Kléber (in French). Paris: Perrin. ISBN 2-262-01674-7.
- Georges, Fleury (2004). Nelson (in French). Paris: Flammarion. ISBN 2-08-068090-0.
