= Battle of Siegburg =

First engagement of the French offensive across the River Rhine

- Part of War of the First Coalition
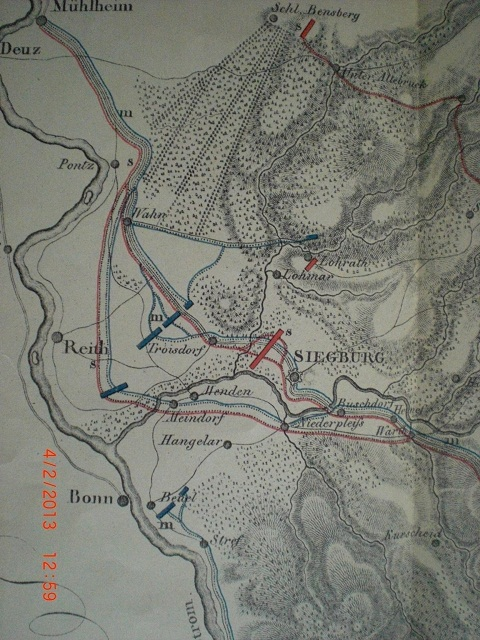
- Detail of the 1796 map from Grundsätze der Strategie by Erzherzog Carl von Österreich
Date	1 June 1796
Location	Siegburg
Result	French victory

Belligerents
France	Austria

Commanders and leaders
Obergeneral Jean-Baptiste Kléber	Prince Augustus of Württemberg

Strength
c. 20,000	c. 7,000

Casualties and losses
Unknown	2,400

The Battle of Siegburg was the first engagement of the French offensive across the River Rhine – that offensive was to become the main campaign of 1796 during the War of the First Coalition. On 30 May 1796 général de division Jean-Baptiste Kléber crossed the river at Düsseldorf with the two divisions commanded by général de division Lefebvre and général de division Colaud. He then moved on Siegburg, where he won the battle on 1 June, thus enabling general Jean-Baptiste Jourdan to bring the bulk of his force across the Rhine at Neuwied.

== Bibliography ==
- Erzherzog Carl von Österreich: Grundsätze der Strategie 2. Anton Strauss, Wien 1814 (eingeschränkte Vorschau in der Google-Buchsuche).
- Jean Baptiste Jourdan übersetzt von Johann Bachoven von Echt: Denkwürdigkeiten der Geschichte des Feldzugs von 1796. Koblenz 1823
- Leopold Bleibtreu: Kriegsbegebenheiten bei Neuwied 1792 bis 1797. Carl Georgi, Bonn 1834, urn:nbn:de:hbz:061:1-73887.
- Peter Heinz Krause: Belagert, erobert, geplündert. Siegburger Kriegszeiten von 1583 bis 1714. Ein militärhistorischer Überblick (= Historische Studien. Band 1). Verlag Franz Schmitt, Siegburg 1998, ISBN 3-87710-185-2, S. 63–64.
- Daniel Schneider: Die Schlacht von Altenkirchen 1796 in ihrem historischen Kontext, in: Heimat-Jahrbuch des Kreises Altenkirchen 55 (2012), S. 183–194.
