= Hôtel de Ville, Thann =

Town hall in Thann, France

Hôtel de Ville
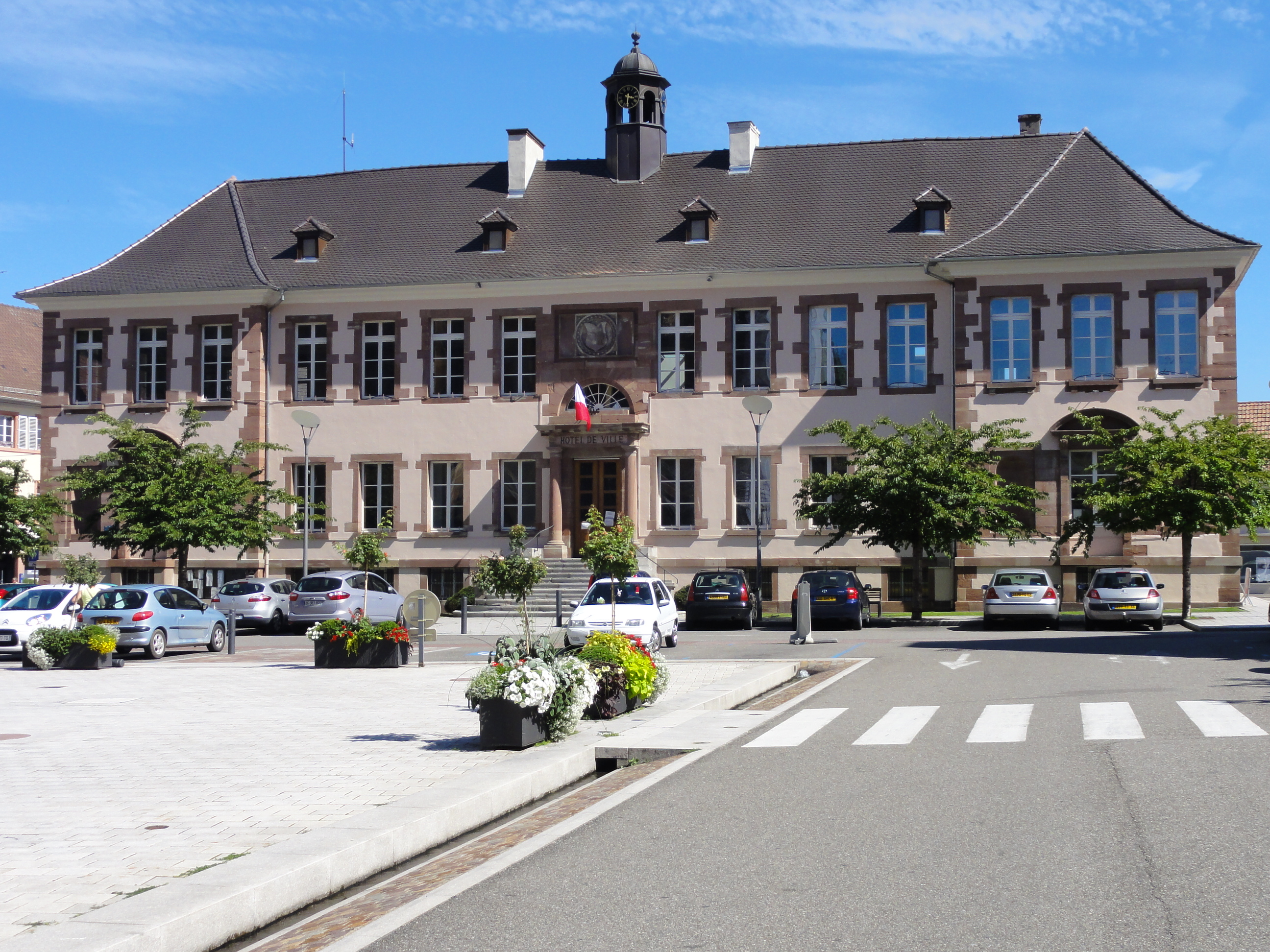
- The main frontage of the Hôtel de Ville in August 2011
- Interactive map of the Hôtel de Ville area

General information
- Type: City hall
- Architectural style: Neoclassical style
- Location: Thann, France
- Coordinates: 47.8106°N 7.1023°E
- Completed: 1793

Design and construction
- Architect: Jean-Baptiste Kléber

The Hôtel de Ville (French pronunciation: [otɛl də vil], City Hall) is a municipal building in Thann, Haut-Rhin, eastern France, standing on Place Joffre. It has been included on the Inventaire général des monuments by the French Ministry of Culture since 1987.

== History ==
A devastating flood took place in Thann in 1778, sweeping away the town hall, about ten houses, and a bridge. In the early 1780s, a programme of works was put in place to rebuild the town. The site on what is now Place Joffre was originally intended for a medical facility to replace Saint-Erhard Hospital, which had been built in the early 15th century. Construction work on the new building started in 1788, but before long it became apparent that the limited funds available would only support the construction of a municipal building. The new building was designed by the inspector of public buildings at Belfort, Jean-Baptiste Kléber, built in brick with a cement render finish and was completed on 27 May 1793.

The design involved a symmetrical main frontage of 15 bays facing onto what is now Place Joffre with the last three bays at each end slightly projected forward as pavilions. The central bay featured a short slight of steps leading up to a square headed doorway flanked by a pair of Doric order columns supporting an entablature and a modillioned cornice. Above the doorway there was a Diocletian window and, on the first floor, there was a panel with a heraldic shield. The other bays were all fenestrated by casement windows with stone surrounds. At roof level, there was an octagonal lantern with four clock faces.

The building was also used for public events: on 6 July 1845, the pianist, Franz Liszt, performed a recital there, at a time when Lisztomania was at its height. The building was damaged by German artillery shells in the margins of the Battle of Hartmannswillerkopf in 1915, part of the First World War. The Chief of Staff, General Joseph Joffre, visited the town hall during the campaign. Following the liberation of the town by the French First Army, under General Jean de Lattre de Tassigny, on 8 December 1944, during the Second World War, a plaque was unveiled on the southwest side of the town hall by the French Resistance leader, Gilbert Grandval, some twenty years later, to commemorate the event.

An extension at the rear, to provide better public access to the building, was constructed in glass to a design by Jacques Koessler, and was officially opened by the mayor, Jean-Pierre Baeumler, in November 2011.
