= Suleiman al-Halabi =

Syrian theology student (1777–1800)

- سليمان الحلبي
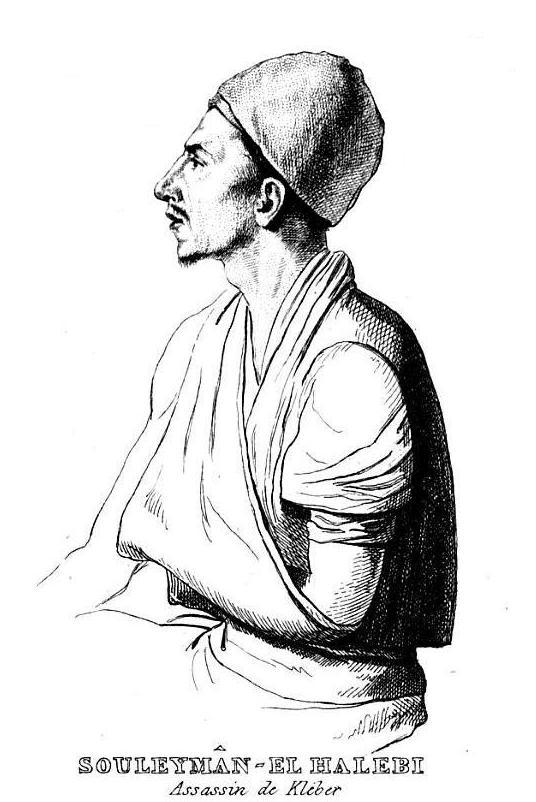
- "Souleymân-El Haleby, assassin de Kléber", 1836, by André Dutertre.
- Born: c. 1777; Kukan, Aleppo, Ottoman Syria
- Died: 17 June 1800 (aged 22-23); Cairo, Egypt
- Education: Al-Azhar University
- Criminal charges: Murder
- Criminal penalty: Death by impalement

Suleiman al-Halabi (Arabic: سليمان الحلبي; c. 1777 – 17 June 1800) was a Syrian theology student best known for assassinating Jean-Baptiste Kléber, then serving as the commander of the French campaign in Egypt and Syria, in 1800. Born in the village of Kukan, Ottoman Syria into a family of Kurdish descent, he was sent by his father to study Islamic theology at the Al-Azhar University in Cairo in 1797 when the French launched a concurrent invasion of Egypt. Completing his studies three years later, he returned home before travelling back to Egypt

Arriving in Cairo, al-Halabi monitored Kléber's residence for approximately a month before sneaking into the garden on 14 June and confronting Kléber, stabbing him to death in disputed circumstances. He tried to escape but was quickly found by French soldiers and arrested. After undergoing torture in French custody, he confessed to killing Kléber. His right hand was burned to the bone before al-Halabi was impaled, dying after four hours. His corpse was subsequently taken to France, where it was placed in display in the Musée de l'Homme and used for an exhibition on phrenology. Al-Halabi has been the subject of short films and plays after his death.

== Early life ==
Suleiman al-Halabi was born c. 1777 in the village of Kukan near Afrin, Ottoman Syria, into a family of Kurdish descent. His father was Mohammed Emin, a Syrian merchant who dealt in butter and olive oil. In 1797, Emin sent his son to study Islamic theology at the Al-Azhar University in Cairo, Egypt. Concurrently, the French First Republic launched an invasion of Egypt led by Napoleon. During his time in Cairo, al-Halabi also started working as a calligrapher alongside his studies. In 1800, he returned to Syria after completing his studies, before subsequently travelling to Palestine and visiting the Al-Aqsa Mosque in Jerusalem.

== Assassination of Kléber ==
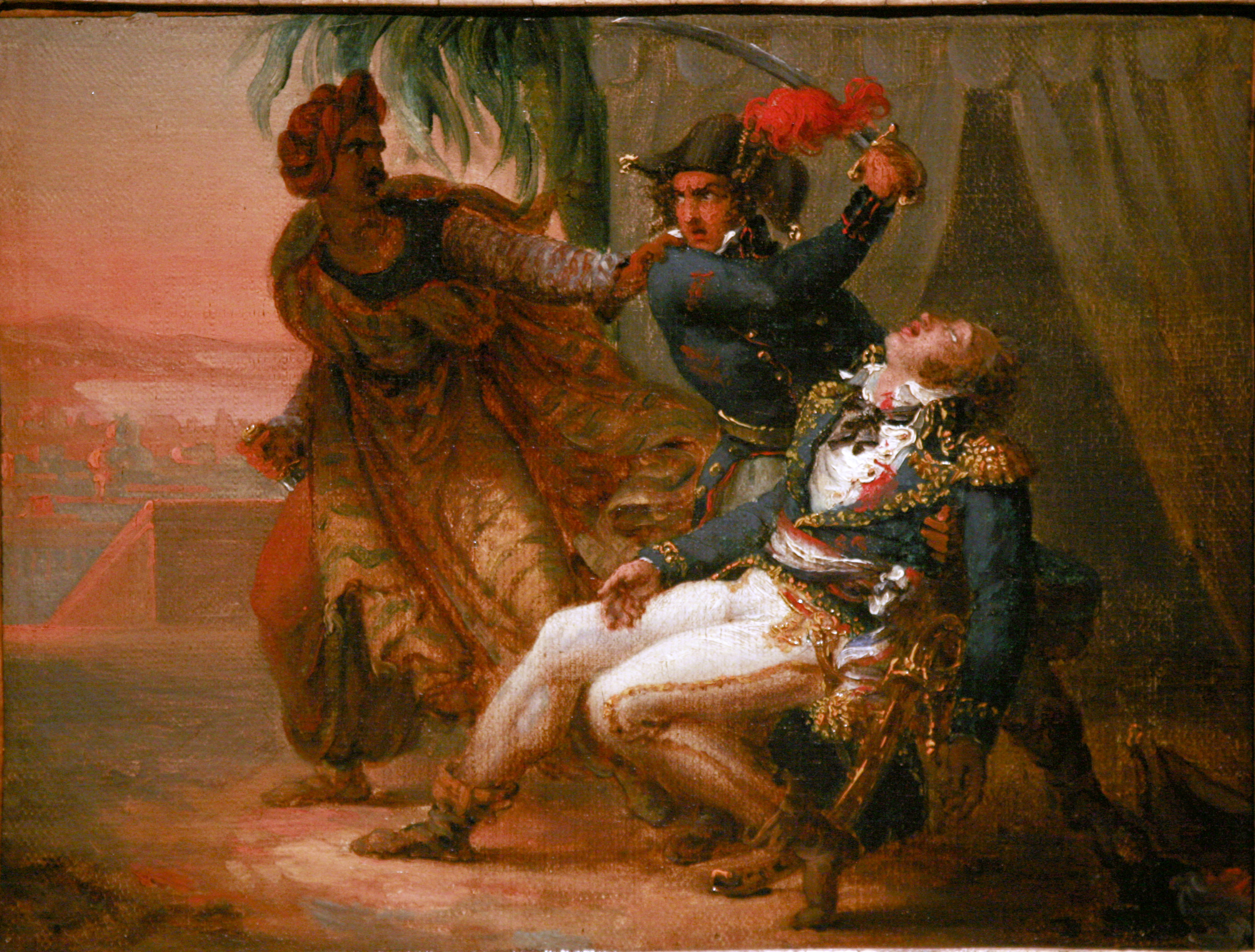
French artist's impression of al-Halabi killing Kléber, by Antoine-Jean Gros.

While in Jerusalem, he met two intelligence officers of the Ottoman Empire. The two officers requested al-Halabi assassinate military officer Jean-Baptiste Kléber, who commanded the French occupational forces in Egypt after Napoleon had returned to France in 1799. Accepting the task, he joined a trade caravan and arrived in Cairo twenty days later. Acquiring a twenty-inch long dagger made in Giza, al-Halabi monitored Kléber's residence in Cairo for approximately one month before making his move. He explained his plans to four Syrian scholars at the mosque he was staying at, who unsuccessfully attempted to dissuade al-Halabi from carrying out the assassination.

On 14 June 1800, al-Halabi entered the gardens of Kléber's residence and fatally wounded him by stabbing Kléber multiple times. Accounts of the assassination differ; in one account, he pretended to be a beggar seeking an audience with Kléber, while another account states that al-Halabi presented a petition for charity to the military officer and stabbed him while Kléber was distracted reading it. The number of times Kléber was stabbed has been disputed as well, with some sources stating he was stabbed four times and other sources stating five times. Kléber's chief military engineer, who was with him at the time, was also stabbed by al-Halabi as he attempted to protect Kléber; he was also mortally wounded, dying a few days later.

== Capture and execution ==
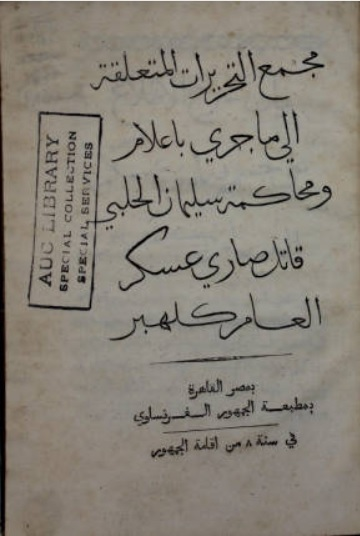
The records of al-Halabi's trial

Al-Halabi attempted to escape the area after assassinating Kléber, burying his dagger. However, French soldiers searching for him eventually discovered al-Halabi in a hiding place and arrested him. He was placed in jail alongside the four scholars, whom the French accused of being complicit in the assassination, after the injured engineer personally identified him. He was interrogated while in French custody, and eventually confessed to murdering Kléber after being tortured. Al-Halabi stated that he was inspired by Allah to slay an "enemy of the Prophet" and claimed that the Agha of Janissaries in Gaza had arranged for him to assassinate Kléber, providing a dromedary and money for the purpose, as the Frenchman had been responsible to inflicting serious defeats against Ottoman forces.

After confessing to Kléber's killing, al-Halabi, alongside the four scholars, was tried by a special court consisting entirely of French officers and convicted of murder. The judges "deferred to local custom" and ordered al-Halabi to be executed on 17 June by having his right hand be burned to the bone before being impaled; the four scholars were beheaded instead. According to historian Edward Dolnick, al-Halabi sat silently while a French official held his hand over heated coal, only protesting when a piece of coal rolled onto his elbow, pointing out that the sentence specified that his hand alone would be burned. After his hand was burned, a nine-foot spike was hammered into al-Halabi's rectum up to his sternum before it was placed onto the ground. He only spoke once during the impalement, crying out that "There is no god but Allah, and Muhammad is his prophet." Eventually, after being impaled for four hours, a French soldier took pity on al-Halabi and gave him water to drink; he died shortly thereafter. French surgeon Dominique Jean Larrey, who witnessed his execution, wrote that al-Halabi "did not give up his proud stance until his death".

His corpse was kept by the French; after French troops were forced to withdraw from the region in 1801, they took his skeleton back to France, along with al-Halabi's dagger, which had been retrieved from its burial place. There, his bones were sent to the National Museum of Natural History in Paris. Kléber's body was eventually repatriated to France, where Napoleon ordered it to be quietly buried on the Île d'If, a small island off the coast of Marseille, where it remained for eighteen years until King Louis XVIII allowed for his remains to be reburied in Kléber's hometown of Strasbourg.

== Legacy ==
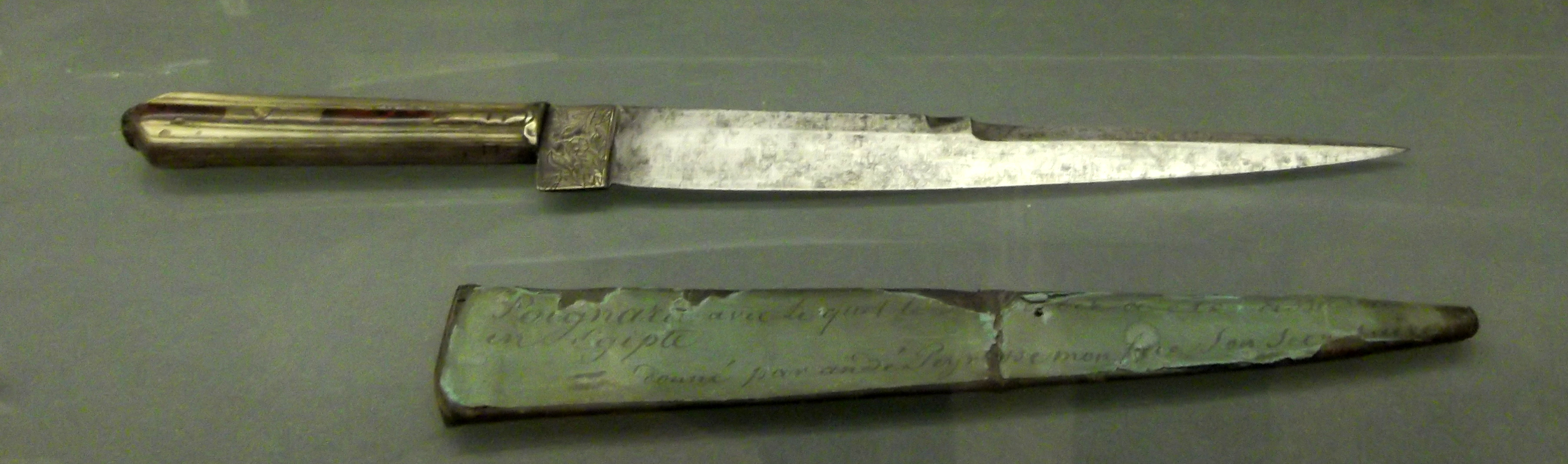
Al-Halabi's dagger on display at the Carcassonne Museum of Fine Arts.

In France, al-Halabi's skull and dagger were placed on display in various museums. The dagger was put on display in a museum in Carcassonne, while his skull was displayed at the Musée de l'Homme, where it was labeled as the "skull of a criminal" and "fanatic", being used as part of a pseudoscientific exhibition on phrenology. His assassination of Kléber was the subject of an 1897 short film by Auguste and Louis Lumière titled Assassinat de Kleber. Syrian activist Charif Kiwan criticized the film, arguing that it "completely misrepresented al-Halabi, giving him a beard when he had none". Egyptian playwright Alfred Farag wrote a 1965 play about the assassination titled Sulayman Al-Halabi, which featured Arab nationalist overtones. In 2011, the Suleiman al-Halabi Institute for Colonial Studies and Ideological Liberation was founded in the West Bank, and among its members was Basil al-Araj. In 2021, Egyptian engineer Ihsan Muharram launched a campaign to repatriate al-Halabi's remains from France to Egypt.
