= Siege of Maastricht (1794) =

Siege of the War of the First Coalition

- Part of the Flanders campaign in the War of the First Coalition
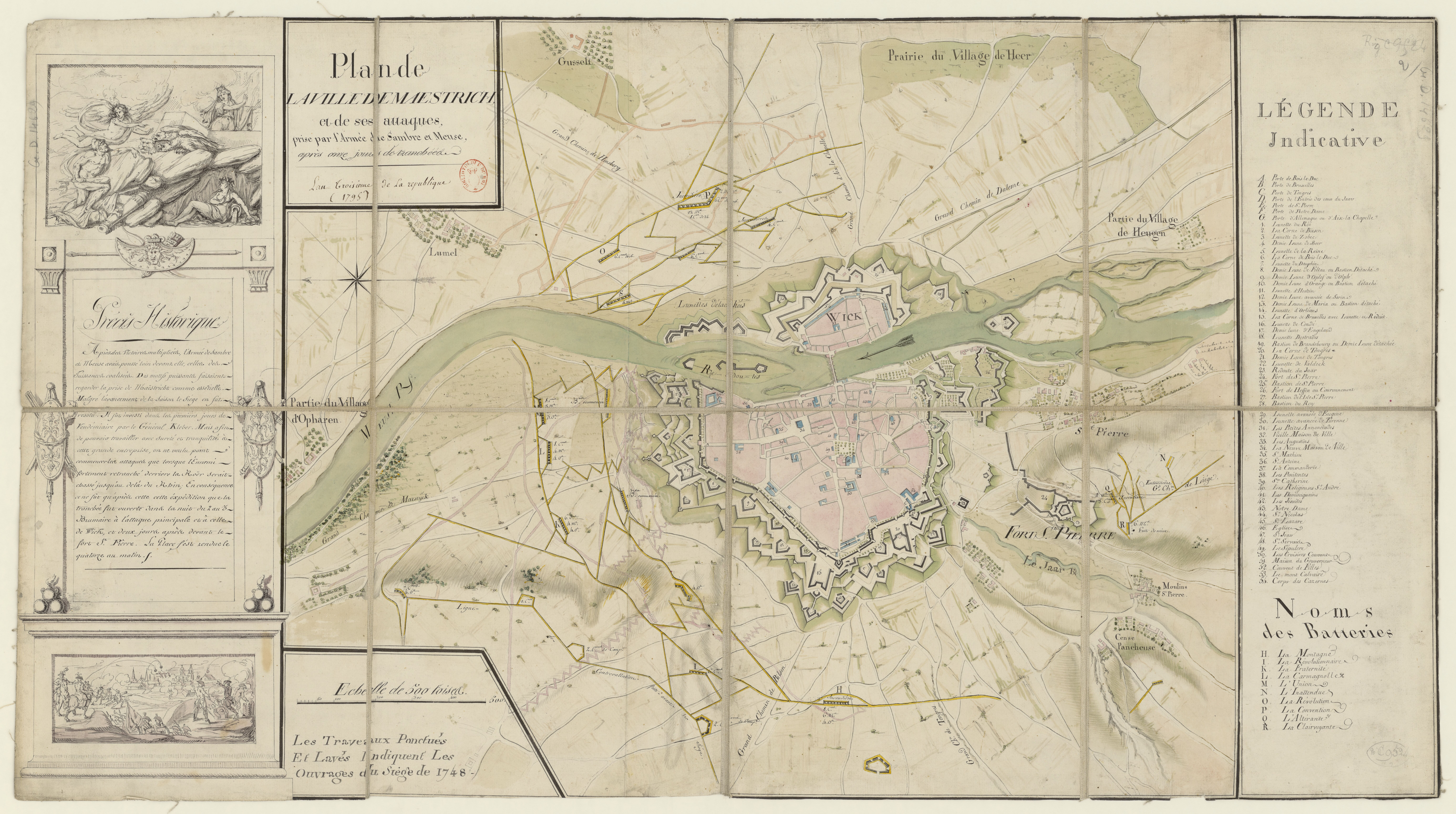
- Contemporary plan of the Siege of Maastricht
Date	22 September – 4 November 1794
Location	Maastricht, Limburg, Netherlands 50°51′N 5°41′E
Result	French victory

Belligerents
France	Habsburg Monarchy; Dutch Republic; Hesse-Kassel

Commanders and leaders
(French First Republic) Jean-Baptiste Kléber	Prince Frederick of Hesse-Kassel (Habsburg monarchy) Wilhelm von Klebeck

Units involved
Army of Sambre-et-Meuse	Coalition

Strength
35,608	8,000, 344 guns

Casualties and losses
300	500, 344 guns Garrison went free.

The siege of Maastricht (22 September – 4 November 1794) was a successful siege of the city of Maastricht by the forces of the French First Republic led by General of Division (GD) Jean-Baptiste Kléber. The War of the First Coalition action resulted in the surrender of the Coalition garrison commanded by Lieutenant General Prince Frederick of Hesse-Kassel. The defenders were mostly Habsburg Austrians with a smaller contingent of Dutch Republic soldiers.

The Coalition armies in the Austrian Netherlands faced two French armies, one near the North Sea coast and one farther inland. The Coalition armies retreated after the French victory at Fleurus. As the French armies pressed forward, the British and Dutch armies withdrew north while the Austrian army fell back to the east. After another victory over the Austrians, the French army led by GD Jean-Baptiste Jourdan isolated Maastricht and its Coalition garrison. Once Jourdan compelled the Austrian army to retire to the east bank of the Rhine River, he detached Kléber's full siege army to force the fortress' surrender.

== Background ==
=== Aftermath of Fleurus ===
The historian Ramsay Weston Phipps believed that the Battle of Fleurus on 26 June 1794 was decisive, even though its importance was not realized at that time. GD Jean-Charles Pichegru's Army of the North pressed the right flank of the Coalition army under Field Marshall Prince Josias of Coburg. However, the drive of Jourdan's Army of Sambre-et-Meuse against Coburg's left flank was the more dangerous thrust because it threatened his army's communications with Austria. If Coburg had beaten Jourdan, he might have turned and crushed Pichegru against the coast. When Coburg failed to defeat Jourdan at Fleurus, the campaign had arrived at a turning point. (Note: The Army of the Sambre-et-Meuse was officially created on 27 June 1794, that is, the day after the Battle of Fleurus. (Phipps, p. 172))

Coburg's army sustained 2,286 casualties at Fleurus, plus the 2,800 men lost when Charleroi surrendered. These losses were not crippling, yet Coburg immediately retreated north and deployed his army with William V, Prince of Orange holding the west flank at Mons, the center at Genappe and Nivelles, and Feldmarschall-Leutnant (FML) Johann Peter Beaulieu defending the east flank at Gembloux. It is a mystery whether Coburg used his own judgment or was following the policy of Austrian foreign minister Johann Amadeus von Thugut to abandon the Austrian Netherlands. This left Frederick, Duke of York and Albany's Coalition forces at Ronse (Renaix) in peril, but, under orders from the all-powerful Committee of Public Safety Pichegru turned away and moved toward the ports of Ostend and Nieuwpoort. On 30 June, there was a conference of Coalition leaders at which Coburg and FML Archduke Charles, Duke of Teschen swore to York that they had no instructions to evacuate Flanders. At the meeting, it was agreed to move Feldzeugmeister François de Croix, Count of Clerfayt's Austrian corps closer to Coburg while shifting York's forces toward the coast.

=== French conquest of Belgium ===
Ordered by the Committee of Public Safety to move northwest to seize Mons, Jourdan did so, taking the city on 1 July. This prompted York's 10,000 troops to retreat to Aalst and Generalmajor Paul Kray's Austrians to evacuate Tournai. At Aalst, York was joined on 5 July by a substantial British force led by Major General Francis Rawdon-Hastings, Lord Moira. Jourdan attacked Coburg's army on 6 July, forcing back the Austrian right wing to Waterloo. Jourdan's army continued attacking over the next two days, compelling Coburg to withdraw to the east. York with 30,000 men retreated to a position behind the Dyle River between Antwerp and Mechelen (Malines). Orange with the Dutch army and 2,000–3,000 Austrians held the line between Mechelen and Leuven (Louvain). Coburg's 45,000–50,000 Austrians defended a line running southeast from Leuven through Tienen (Tirlemont) to the Meuse River. A 4,000-man force was posted on Coburg's left flank on the east bank of the Meuse. The French occupied Brussels on 10 July.

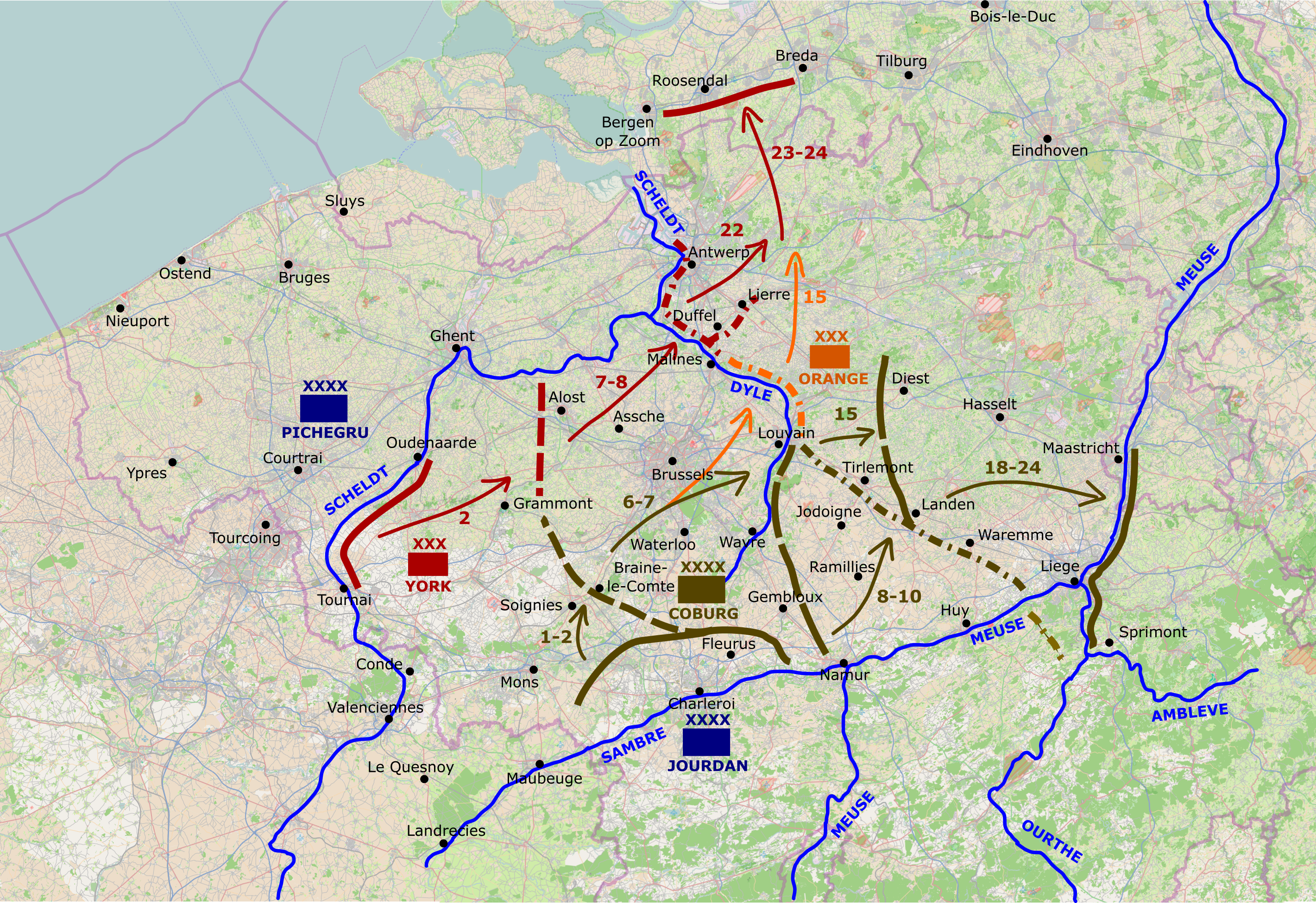
Map depicts the Flanders campaign, showing the dates in July 1794 when movements occurred.

At this time, the Committee of Public Safety insisted that the Coalition-held fortresses in northern France must be retaken at once. Therefore, GD Barthélemy Louis Joseph Schérer was detached with 30,000 men for that purpose. Meanwhile, the French captured Mechelen and Leuven on 15 July and, a few days later, Coburg's army began withdrawing east to Hasselt. With his left flank in air, York was compelled to abandon Antwerp on 22 July and pull back north into the Dutch Republic. At the end of July, York's army consisted of 38,419 officers and men in the infantry and cavalry. Of these, 21,753 infantry and 4,515 cavalry were British and the rest mostly Hanoverians and Hessians. On 27 July, the left wing of Jourdan's army under GD Jean-Baptiste Kléber seized Tongeren (Tongres) while the right wing under GD Jacques Maurice Hatry captured Liège. The Austrian army was deployed behind the Meuse, facing east, with its right flank at Roermond, its center at Maastricht, and its left flank opposite Liège. At this time, Coburg was replaced in command of the Austrian army by Clerfayt.

The French armies paused as the Coalition-held fortresses were besieged and captured. During this lull, incompetent officers such as GD François Muller were removed and the various regular and volunteer battalions were welded into regiments. Landrecies fell on 16 July, Nieuwpoort surrendered on 18 July, Le Quesnoy capitulated on 16 August, and Sluis fell on 24 August. Their garrisons became prisoners of war. Valenciennes surrendered on 27 August and Condé-sur-l'Escaut capitulated on 29 August; their garrisons were paroled. The fall of Maximilien Robespierre occurred at the end of July 1794, effectively ending the Reign of Terror.

Schérer's siege corps rejoined the Army of Sambre-et-Meuse on 11 September 1794, and Jourdan assigned it to his right wing where he determined to make his attack. Schérer's wing crossed the Meuse at Namur and Huy and on 14 September it seized a crossing of the Ourthe River at Comblain-au-Pont. The right wing included the divisions of GDs François Séverin Marceau, Jean Adam Mayer, Honoré Hacquin, and part of Hatry's. On 17 September, Kléber feinted an attack on Maastricht so convincingly that Clerfayt reinforced his right flank and center. In the Battle of Sprimont on 18 September, Schérer's 35,000 troops defeated Clerfayt's left wing under FML Maximilian Anton Karl, Count Baillet de Latour, which counted 18,000 men. The French lost about 1,000 casualties, but inflicted 1,500 killed and wounded on their foes, as wells as capturing 1,000 men and 36 cannons.

== Siege ==
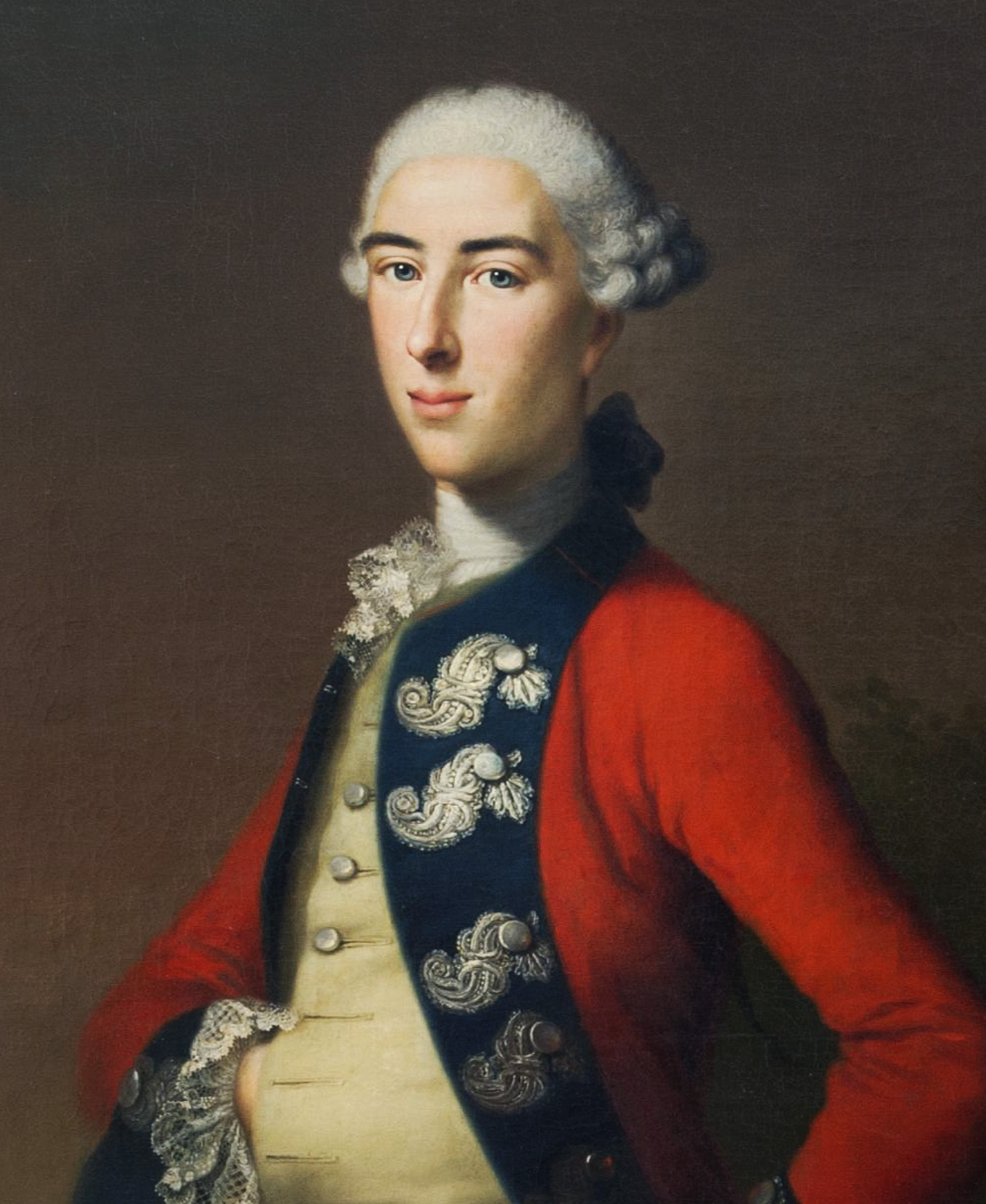
Prince Frederick of Hesse-Kassel

Clerfayt abandoned Aachen (Aix-la-Chapelle) and retreated behind the Rur (Roer) River. The Austrian right flank was still at Roermond while the rest of their defense line ran past Linnich, Jülich, Düren, and ended at Nideggen. Clerfayt also maintained a bridgehead at Aldenhoven on the west bank. The divisions of Hatry and GD Jean-Étienne Championnet crossed the Meuse at Liège and took Aachen. Kléber's left wing surrounded Maastricht which the Committee of Public Safety wanted besieged immediately. Not wanting to repeat Charles François Dumouriez's mistake in the 1793 Siege of Maastricht by tying up too much of his field army, Jourdan detached GD Guillaume Philibert Duhesme's 15,000 men to blockade the city while keeping the remainder of Kléber's wing for active operations.

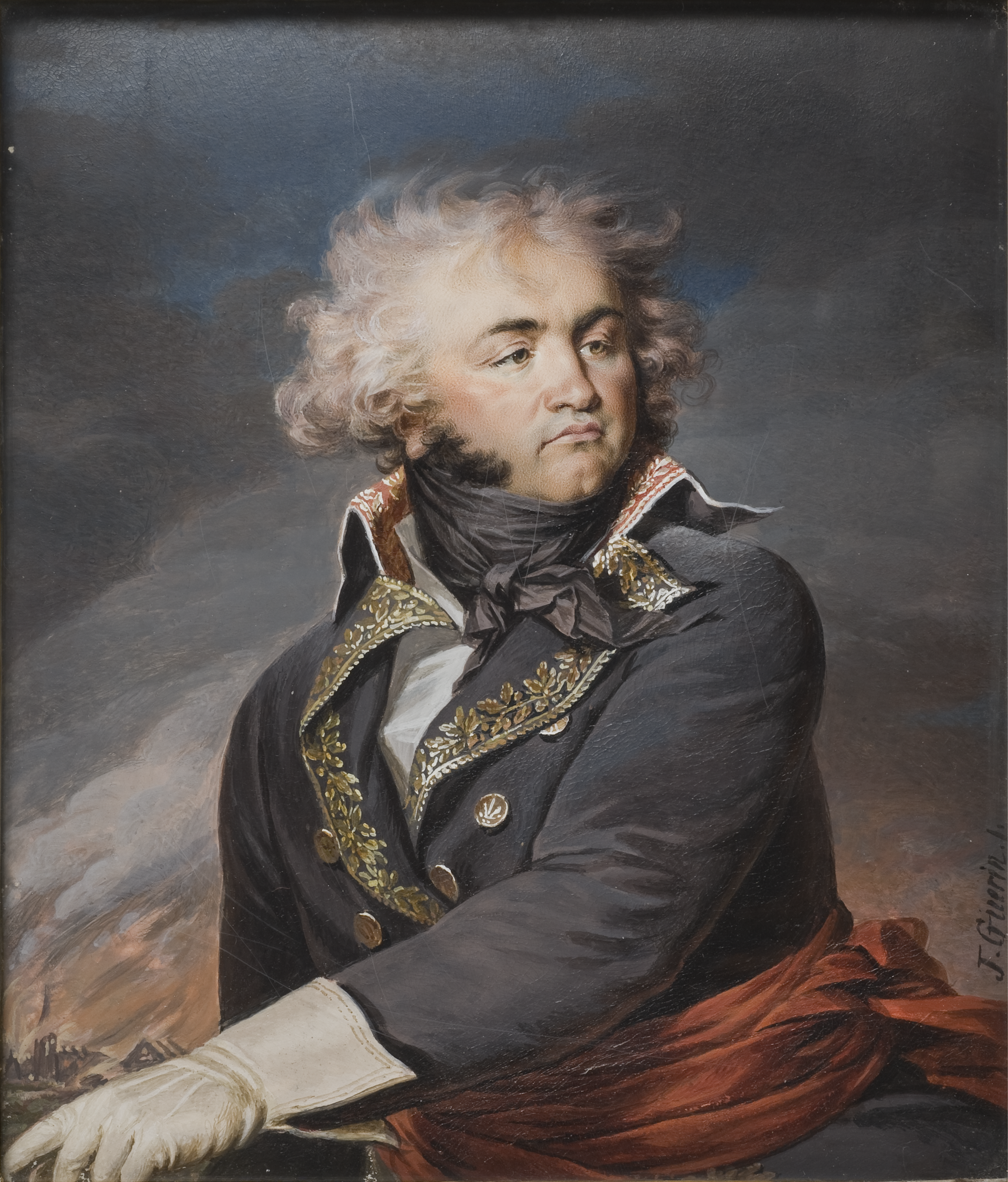
Jean-Baptiste Kléber

The siege of Maastricht commenced on 22 September 1794. The 8,000-man garrison was commanded by Prince Frederick of Hesse-Kassel. The Austrian commander of the fortress was FML Wilhelm von Klebeck. Earlier, Kléber had taken Captain Michel Ney on his staff, and for his exploits, Ney was promoted to Adjutant General on 1 August 1794. Kléber's wing included the divisions of GD Jean-Baptiste Jules Bernadotte, General of Brigade (GB) Louis Friant, and GB Joseph Léonard Richard. Friant, who only held a brevet general officer rank, replaced the inept Muller. On 24 September, Bernadotte's division crossed the Meuse. Kléber instructed Ney to lead Bernadotte's division with the 16th Horse Chasseurs and the 2nd and 4th Hussar Regiments, and Ney's cavalry captured Heinsberg. The 99,000 soldiers of the Army of Sambre-et-Meuse faced Clerfayt's 76,000 Austrians in the Battle of Aldenhoven on 2 October 1794. After a day of fighting, Kléber's left wing and Schérer's right wing gained small bridgeheads across the Rur. With both his flanks compromised, Clerfayt decided to retreat. The Austrian army withdrew across the Rhine River near Cologne on 6 October.

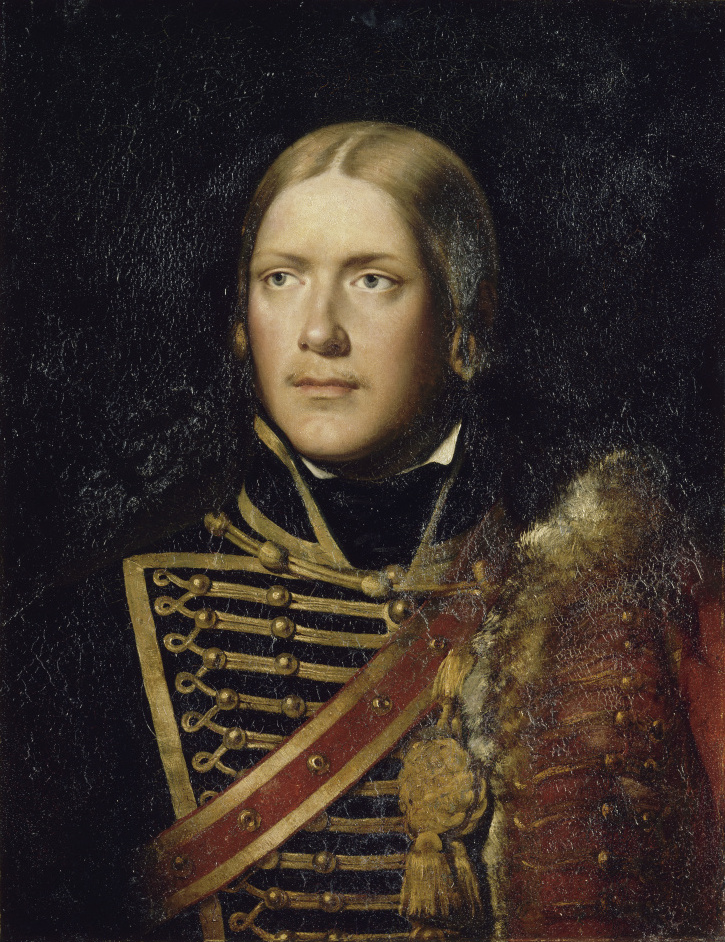
Michel Ney in 1792.

Jourdan first established his army on the west bank of the Rhine, then he sent Kléber's three divisions back to lay siege to Maastricht. At this time, the two French armies farther south also closed up to the Rhine. These were the Army of the Moselle under GD Jean René Moreaux and the Army of the Rhine under GD Claude Ignace François Michaud. The right wing of the Army of Moselle moved from Trier to Mainz while its left wing advanced to Coblenz. The left wing of the Army of the Rhine moved to Mainz.

Phipps stated that Kléber's Armée devant Maastricht comprised the divisions of Duhesme, Bernadotte, and André Poncet while Digby Smith included the divisions of Bernadotte, Richard (with Poncet as a subordinate), Duhesme, and Friant. One amusing event during the siege occurred when a mine exploded under one of the forts exposing a cavern. When French soldiers rushed in, they discovered a herd of pigs that had been cached there by the garrison. At first, Jourdan retained Ney with the main army because he valued his ability. Ney led cavalry raids as far as Kleve (Cleves) and Nijmegen, but when he came near Maastricht, Kléber got the Représentant en mission Pierre-Mathurin Gillet to reassign Ney to the siege army.

Kléber summoned Prince Frederick to surrender, and when he refused, the 80 French siege guns opened fire on 1 November. The morale of the Austrian defenders crumbled under the intense bombardment. Austrian soldiers began plundering the homes of the city's inhabitants and were fired on by Dutch soldiers. Twice Kléber sent Ney into the fortress to negotiate. On Ney's second visit, he accused the fortress commander of "sacrificing the town to his personal glory", and he was so persuasive that Prince Frederick capitulated on 4 November. The garrison marched out with the honors of war on 7 November, and was allowed to go free. The defenders surrendered 344 guns and 31 regimental colors. French forces sustained 300 casualties while the Coalition garrison lost 500 killed and wounded.

Maastricht was the home of the famous Mosasaurus fossil holotype skull, and the French intellectuals insisted that the building housing the fossil should not be fired upon during the siege. When the city was captured, the French appropriated the head of the mosasaur fossil and sent it to Paris, where he reside since.

== Forces ==
=== Coalition order of battle ===
Prince Frederick of Hesse-Kassel's garrison
Units	Size/Strength
(Holy Roman Empire) Michael Wallis Infantry Regiment Nr. 11	2 battalions
(Holy Roman Empire) Kheul Infantry Regiment Nr. 19	2 battalions
(Holy Roman Empire) Kinsky Infantry Regiment Nr. 36	2nd Battalion
(Holy Roman Empire) Stain Infantry Regiment Nr. 50	1 battalion
(Holy Roman Empire) Wenzel Colloredo Infantry Regiment Nr. 56	2 battalions
(Dutch Republic) Nassau-Usingen Infantry Regiment	1 battalion
(Dutch Republic) Von Wilcke Infantry Regiment	Depot
(Dutch Republic) Gunners	316 men
(Dutch Republic) Miners	173 men
Hesse-Kassel Dragoon Regiment	4 squadrons
Coalition total	8,000 men, 344 guns

=== French order of battle ===
Jean-Baptiste Kléber's Siege Army
Divisions	Brigades	Units	Size/Strength
GD Jean-Baptiste Jules Bernadotte; 9,215 men (Note: Bernadotte was promoted GD (general of division) on 22 October 1794. (Phipps, p. 189))	GB Henri Jacques Jean Boyer	32nd Light Infantry Demi-Brigade	1 battalion
GD Jean-Baptiste Jules Bernadotte; 9,215 men	GB Henri Jacques Jean Boyer	21st Line Infantry Demi-Brigade	3rd Battalion
GD Jean-Baptiste Jules Bernadotte; 9,215 men	GB Henri Jacques Jean Boyer	71st Line Infantry Demi-Brigade	3 battalions
GD Jean-Baptiste Jules Bernadotte; 9,215 men	GB Henri Jacques Jean Boyer	72nd Line Infantry Demi-Brigade	3 battalions
GD Jean-Baptiste Jules Bernadotte; 9,215 men	GB Henri Jacques Jean Boyer	2nd Hussar Regiment	-
GD Jean-Baptiste Jules Bernadotte; 9,215 men	GB Henri Jacques Jean Boyer	4th Hussar Regiment	-
GD Jean-Baptiste Jules Bernadotte; 9,215 men	GB Henri Jacques Jean Boyer	7th Dragoon Regiment	-
GD Jean-Baptiste Jules Bernadotte; 9,215 men	GB Henri Jacques Jean Boyer	13th Cavalry Regiment	-
GD Jean-Baptiste Jules Bernadotte; 9,215 men	GB Henri Jacques Jean Boyer	32nd Gendarmes	2 companies
GD Jean-Baptiste Jules Bernadotte; 9,215 men	GB Henri Jacques Jean Boyer	34th Gendarmes	2 companies
GD Jean-Baptiste Jules Bernadotte; 9,215 men	GB Henri Jacques Jean Boyer	Foot Artillery	2 batteries
GD Jean-Baptiste Jules Bernadotte; 9,215 men	GB Henri Jacques Jean Boyer	Engineers	1 company
GB Joseph Léonard Richard; 9,961 men (Note: Smith listed Richard as GD, but Broughton showed that he was promoted GB (general of brigade) in 1793 and never promoted GD.)	GB André Poncet; GB Joseph-Valérian de Boisset	1st Foot Chasseurs Demi-Brigade	3 battalions
GB Joseph Léonard Richard; 9,961 men	GB André Poncet; GB Joseph-Valérian de Boisset	35th Line Infantry Demi-Brigade	3 battalions
GB Joseph Léonard Richard; 9,961 men	GB André Poncet; GB Joseph-Valérian de Boisset	97th Line Infantry Demi-Brigade	3 battalions
GB Joseph Léonard Richard; 9,961 men	GB André Poncet; GB Joseph-Valérian de Boisset	127th Line Infantry Demi-Brigade	3 battalions
GB Joseph Léonard Richard; 9,961 men	GB André Poncet; GB Joseph-Valérian de Boisset	128th Line Infantry Demi-Brigade	3 battalions
GB Joseph Léonard Richard; 9,961 men	GB André Poncet; GB Joseph-Valérian de Boisset	12th Horse Chasseur Regiment	-
GB Joseph Léonard Richard; 9,961 men	GB André Poncet; GB Joseph-Valérian de Boisset	16th Horse Chasseur Regiment	-
GB Joseph Léonard Richard; 9,961 men	GB André Poncet; GB Joseph-Valérian de Boisset	Foot Artillery	1 battery
GD Guillaume Philibert Duhesme; 7,663 men	GB Charles Daurier	93rd Line Infantry Demi-Brigade	3 battalions
GD Guillaume Philibert Duhesme; 7,663 men	GB Charles Daurier	111th Line Infantry Demi-Brigade	3 battalions
GD Guillaume Philibert Duhesme; 7,663 men	GB Charles Daurier	123rd Line Infantry Demi-Brigade	3 battalions
GD Guillaume Philibert Duhesme; 7,663 men	GB Charles Daurier	Volunteer Chasseurs	4th Battalion
GD Guillaume Philibert Duhesme; 7,663 men	GB Charles Daurier	2nd Horse Chasseurs Regiment	-
GD Guillaume Philibert Duhesme; 7,663 men	GB Charles Daurier	17th Cavalry Regiment	-
GD Guillaume Philibert Duhesme; 7,663 men	GB Charles Daurier	Engineers	1 company
GB Louis Friant; 8,769 men (Note: Smith listed Friant as a GD, but in fact he was only a brevet GB. (Friant, p. 10))	GB Brusette (?); GB Claude Ursule Gency	33rd Line Infantry Demi-Brigade	3 battalions
GB Louis Friant; 8,769 men	GB Brusette (?); GB Claude Ursule Gency	49th Line Infantry Demi-Brigade	3 battalions
GB Louis Friant; 8,769 men	GB Brusette (?); GB Claude Ursule Gency	74th Line Infantry Demi-Brigade	2nd Battalion
GB Louis Friant; 8,769 men	GB Brusette (?); GB Claude Ursule Gency	161st Line Infantry Demi-Brigade	3 battalions
GB Louis Friant; 8,769 men	GB Brusette (?); GB Claude Ursule Gency	Guard National Somme	2nd Battalion
GB Louis Friant; 8,769 men	GB Brusette (?); GB Claude Ursule Gency	Guard National Vosges	3rd Battalion
GB Louis Friant; 8,769 men	GB Brusette (?); GB Claude Ursule Gency	Engineers	1 company
French totals	-	-	35,608 men

== Notes ==
Footnotes

Citations
