= Boissière station =

Metro station in Paris, France

Boissière
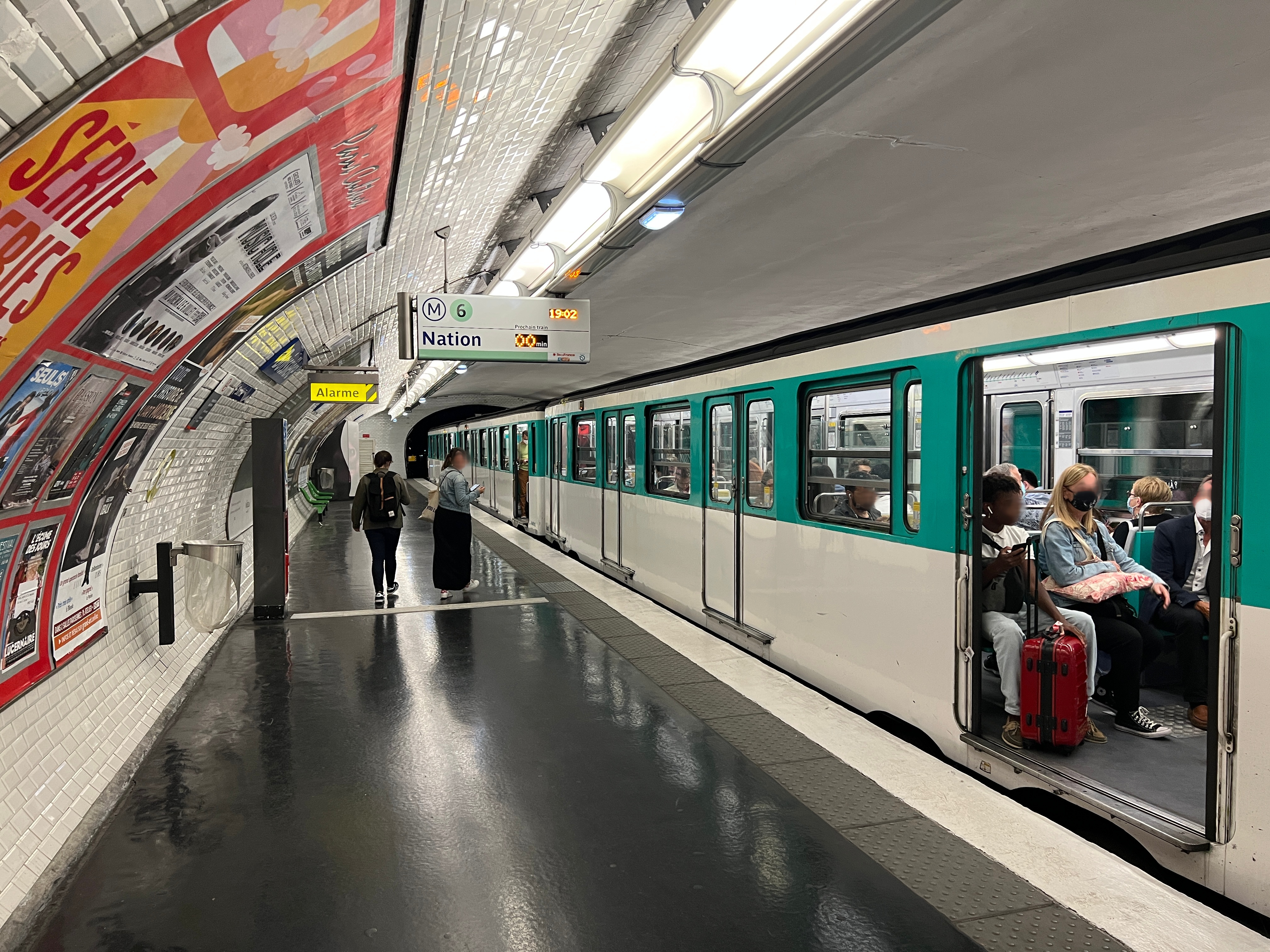

General information
- Location: 16th arrondissement of Paris; Île-de-France; France
- Coordinates: 48°52′03″N 2°17′25″E
- System: Paris Métro station
- Owner: RATP
- Operator: RATP

Other information
- Fare zone: 1

History
- Opened: 2 October 1900

Services
Preceding station	Paris Metro	Following station
Kléber towards Charles de Gaulle–Étoile	Line 6	Trocadéro towards Nation
Location
- Location within Paris

Boissière (French: [bwasjɛʁ]) is a station of the Paris Métro serving line 6 at the intersection of the Rue Boissière and the Avenue Kleber in the 16th arrondissement.

== History ==
The station opened on 2 October 1900 as a branch of line 1 from Étoile to Trocadéro. On 5 November 1903 this line was extended to Passy and the line from Étoile to Trocadéro and Passy became known as line 2 South as part of a planned ring line around central Paris to be built under or over the boulevards built in place of the demolished Wall of the Farmers-General; this circle is now operated as two lines: 2 and 6. On 12 October 1907 the line from Étoile to Trocadéro, Place d'Italie and Gare du Nord became part of line 5. On 6 October 1942 the section of line 5 from Étoile to Place d'Italie, including Boissière, was transferred to line 6.

In 1730, Rue Boissière was a road out of the city which was an extension of the Rue de la Croix-Boissière (French for "street of the wooden cross") inside Paris. Its name came from the custom of remembering the crucifixion by hanging up boxwood on Palm Sunday. The station is close to the location of the Barrière des Réservoirs, a gate built for the collection of taxation as part of the Wall of the Farmers-General; the gate was built between 1784 and 1788 and demolished in the nineteenth century.

== Passenger services ==
=== Access ===
The station has a single entrance called Avenue Kléber, leading to the right of no. 57 in the avenue. Consisting of a fixed staircase, it is decorated with a Guimard entrance, which is the subject of a registration as a historical monument by the decree of 12 February 2016.

=== Station layout ===
Street Level

B1	Mezzanine for platform connection

Platform level	Side platform, doors will open on the right
Platform level	toward Charles de Gaulle – Étoile	← toward Charles de Gaulle – Étoile (Kléber)
Platform level	toward Nation	toward Nation (Trocadéro) →
Platform level	Side platform, doors will open on the right

=== Platforms ===
Boissière is a station of standard configuration. It has two platforms separated by the metro tracks and the vault is elliptical. The decoration is of the style used for most metro stations, the light canopies are white and rounded in the Gaudin style of the 2000s metro revival, and the bevelled white ceramic tiles cover the walls, tunnel exits and corridor outlets. The vault is painted white. The advertising frames are metallic, and the name of the station is inscribed in Parisine font on enamelled plates. The seats are Motte style in green.

== Bus connections ==
The station is served by lines 22, 30 and 82 of the RATP Bus Network.

== Nearby ==
- Square Thomas Jefferson
