= Kléber station =

Metro station in Paris, France

Kléber
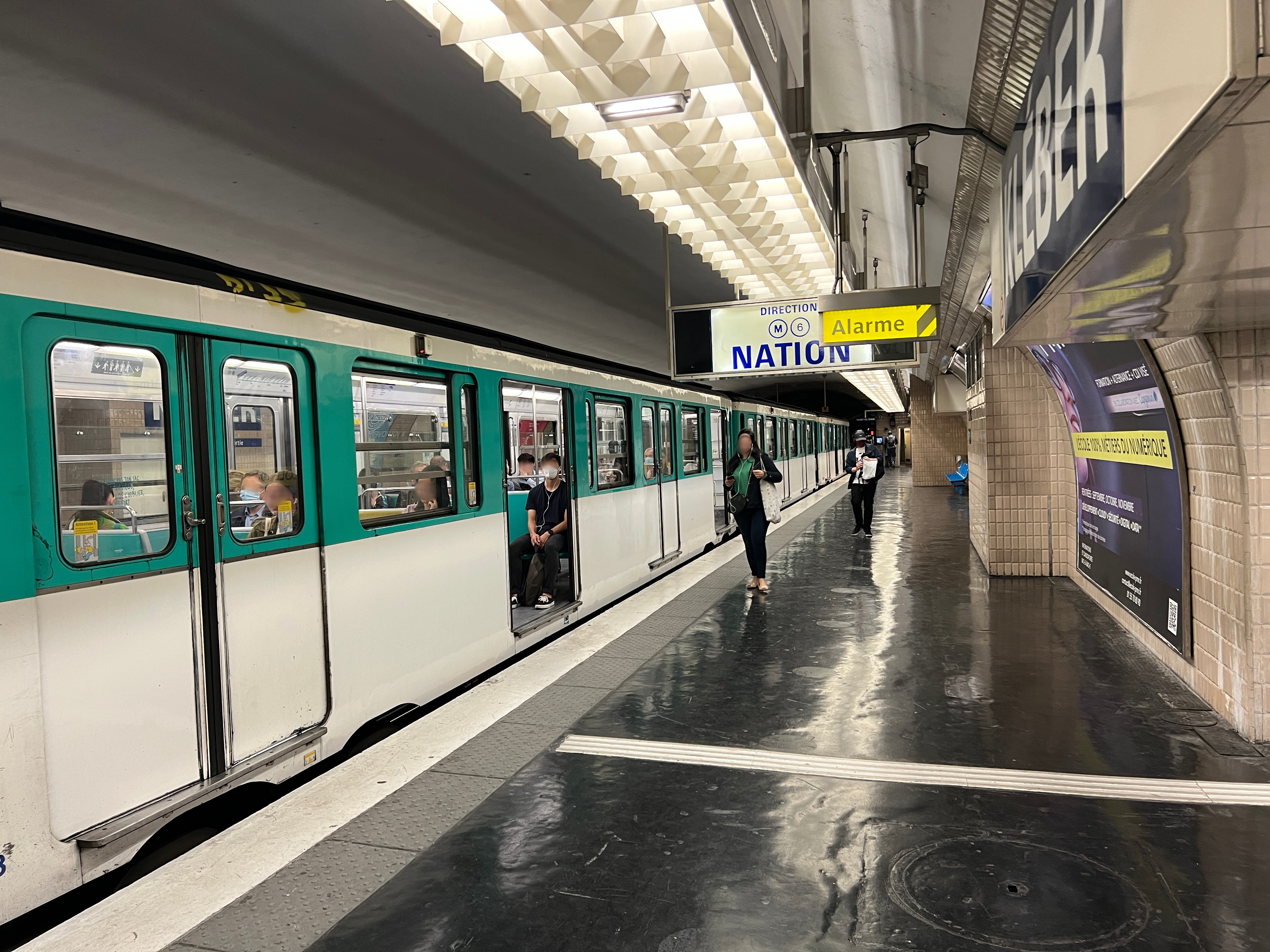

General information
- Location: 16th arrondissement of Paris; Île-de-France; France
- Coordinates: 48°52′16″N 2°17′35″E
- System: Paris Métro station
- Owner: RATP
- Operator: RATP

Other information
- Fare zone: 1

History
- Opened: 2 October 1900

Services
Preceding station	Paris Metro	Following station
Charles de Gaulle–Étoile Terminus	Line 6	Boissière towards Nation
Location
- Location within Paris

Kléber (French: [klebɛʁ]) is a station of the Paris Métro serving Line 6 at the intersection of Avenue Kléber and the Avenue des Portugais in the 16th arrondissement.

== History ==
The station opened on 2 October 1900 as a branch of Line 1 from Étoile to Trocadéro. On 5 November 1903 this line was extended to Passy and the line from Étoile to Trocadéro and Passy became known as Line 2 South as part of a planned ring line around central Paris to be built under or over the boulevards built in place of the demolished Wall of the Farmers-General; this circle is now operated as two lines: 2 and 6. On 14 October 1907 the line from Étoile to Trocadéro, Place d'Italie and Gare du Nord became part of Line 5. On 6 October 1942 the section of Line 5 from Étoile to Place d'Italie, including Boissière, was transferred to Line 6. Avenue Kléber commemorates Jean Baptiste Kléber (1753–1800), a General in the Revolutionary and Napoleonic Wars, particularly noted for his leadership in the Egyptian campaign, where he was assassinated.

Although Charles de Gaulle - Étoile is designated as the terminus of Line 6, the single track loop at Charles de Gaulle - Étoile limits the capacity of Line 6 at that station. Instead of having an extended terminal stop at Charles de Gaulle - Étoile, Line 6 trains depart quickly back round the loop and then stop for an extended period of time at Kléber, which has extra platforms and tracks to accommodate the arrangement.

== Passenger services ==
=== Access ===
The station has two entrances leading to either side of Avenue Kléber, each decorated with a Guimard edicule that were listed as a historical monument by decree on 12 February 2016:

- entrance 1 - "avenue Kléber" - odd number side of the avenue, located to the right of no. 15;
- entrance 2 - "avenue Kléber" - even number side of the avenue, located opposite nos. 12 and 14.

=== Station layout ===
Street Level

B1	Mezzanine for platform connection

Platform level	toward Charles de Gaulle – Étoile	← toward Charles de Gaulle – Étoile (Terminus)
Platform level	Island platform, Doors will open on the left, right
Platform level	toward Charles de Gaulle – Étoile	← toward Charles de Gaulle – Étoile (Terminus)
Platform level	toward Nation	toward Nation (Boissière) →
Platform level	Island platform, Doors will open on the left, right
Platform level	toward Nation	toward Nation (Boissière) →

=== Platform ===
Kléber is a station of particular configuration. It has four tracks due to its role as "technical" terminus. It is used as a prolonged stop of trains before or after their passage at the terminus of Charles de Gaulle - Étoile depending on the necessary regulations and break times for the drivers. The "commercial" terminus of Charles de Gaulle - Étoile is too constrained to be able to play this role effectively.

The side tracks are partially separated from the original central tracks by walls, the station being initially of standard configuration with two platforms separated by the metro tracks located in the centre. It is therefore divided into three parts, each with an elliptical vault. The north end, however, is contiguous, and has two vertical walls and a horizontal ceiling.

The decoration is typical of the 1970s. The light canopies are suspended and designed with crisscrossed metal slats, while beige ceramic tiles, aligned vertically (found only at Porte de Bagnolet and Gallieni stations on line 3), cover the walls of the platforms, the tunnel exits as well as the end of the vaults. The vaults are painted white as are most of the side walls. The advertising frames are metallic, and the name of the station is inscribed in capital letters on large, enamelled plaques. The seats are a blue Motte style.

== Bus connections ==
The station is served by lines 22 and 30 of the RATP Bus Network and, at night, by line N53 of the Noctilien bus network.

== Gallery ==
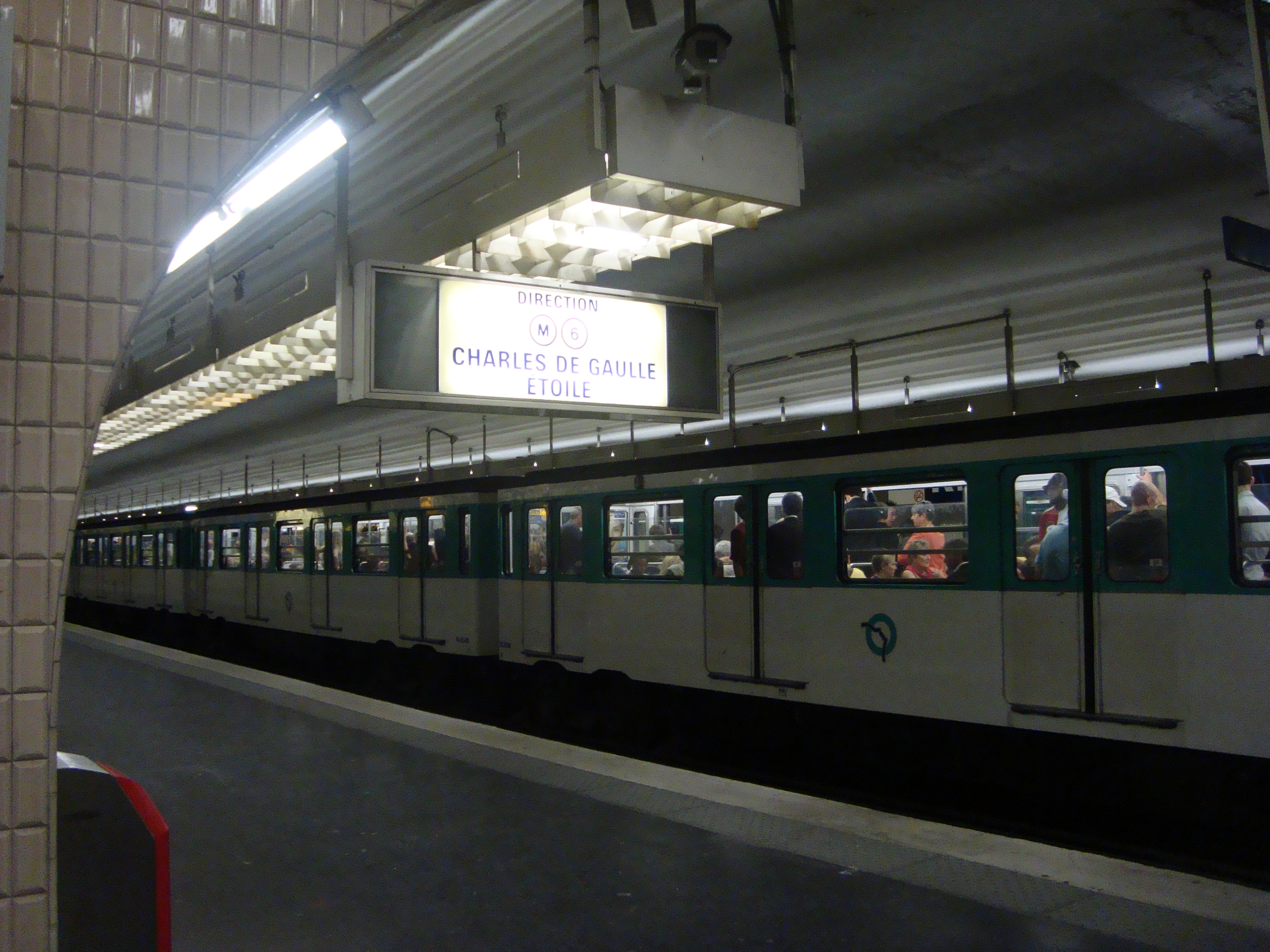
Line 6 platforms at Kléber
