= Thann, Haut-Rhin =

Subprefecture and commune in Grand Est, France

Thann Dànn
- Subprefecture and commune
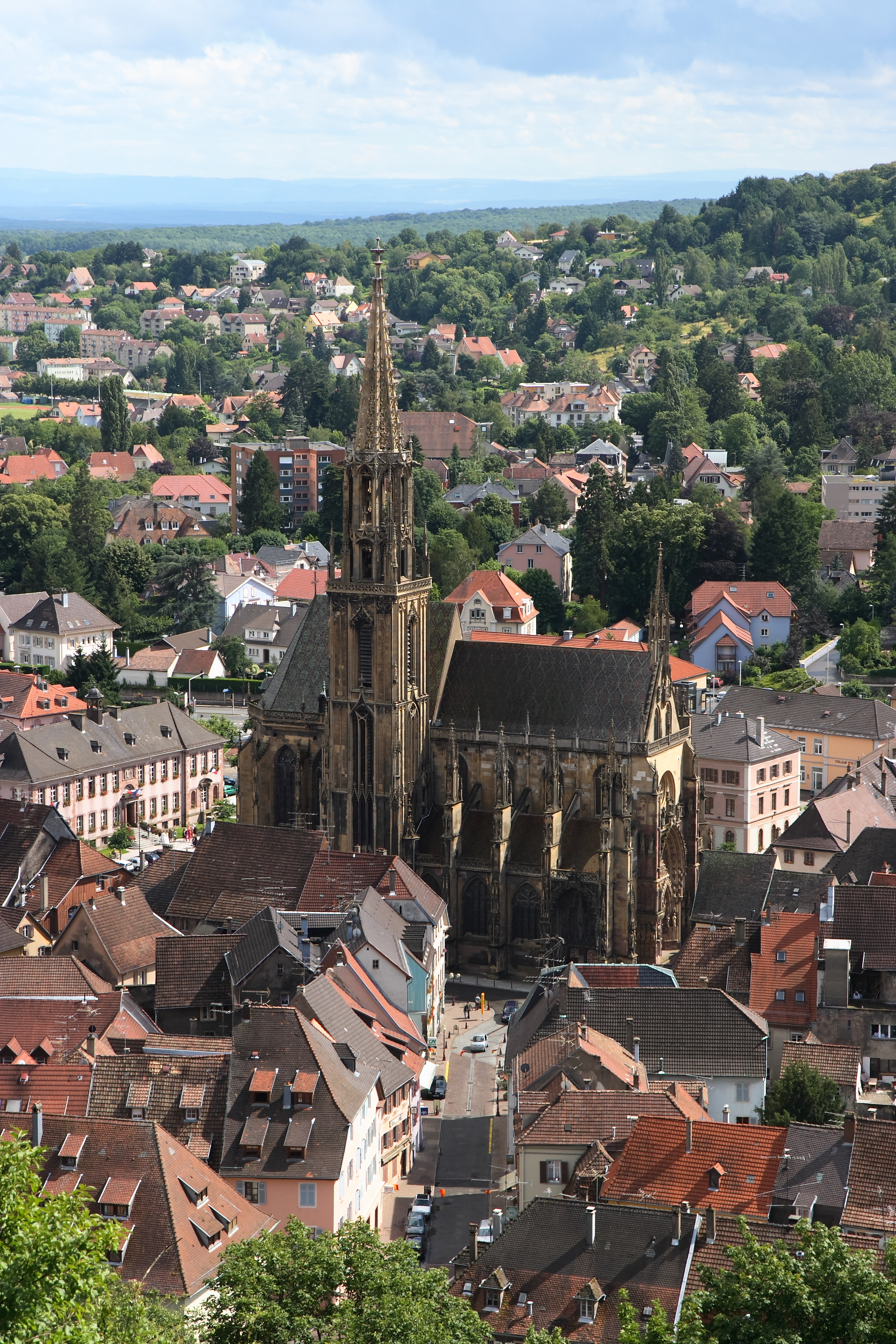
- The church in Thann

- Coat of arms
- Location of Thann
- Location within France Location within Grand Est
- Coordinates: 47°48′26″N 7°06′19″E
- Country: France
- Region: Grand Est
- Department: Haut-Rhin
- Arrondissement: Thann-Guebwiller
- Canton: Cernay
- Intercommunality: CC de Thann-Cernay

Government
  - Mayor (2026–32): Charles Schnebelen
- Area^{1}: 12.51 km^{2} (4.83 sq mi)
- Elevation: 343 m (1,125 ft)
- Highest elevation: 922 m (3,025 ft)
- Lowest elevation: 328 m (1,076 ft)
- Population (2023): 7,762
  - Density: 620.5/km^{2} (1,607/sq mi)
- Time zone: UTC+01:00 (CET)
  - Summer (DST): UTC+02:00 (CEST)
- INSEE/Postal code: 68334 /68800
- ^{1} French Land Register data, which excludes lakes, ponds, glaciers > 1 km^{2} (0.386 sq mi or 247 acres) and river estuaries.

Thann (French pronunciation: [tan]; Alsatian: Dànn, pronounced [tɔn], German: Thann) is a commune in the northeastern French department of Haut-Rhin, in Grand Est. It is the sous-préfecture of the arrondissement of Thann-Guebwiller and part of the canton of Cernay. Its inhabitants are known as Thannois in French.

== Geography ==
Thann is situated at the foot of the Vosges mountains, where the valley of the river Thur enters the Upper Rhine Plain. The Thur runs through the middle of the town.

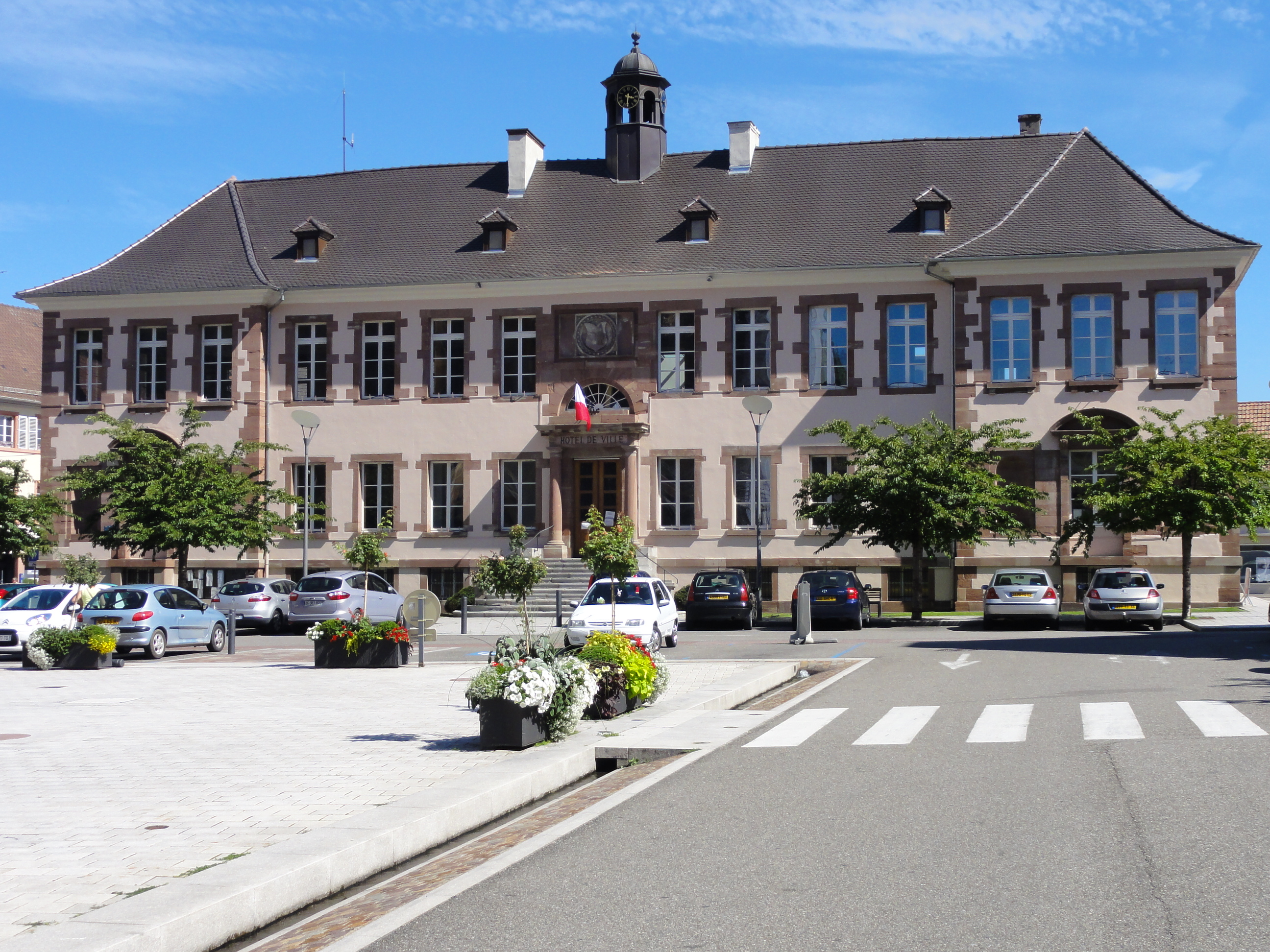
The Hôtel de Ville

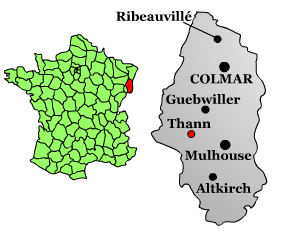
Position of Thann

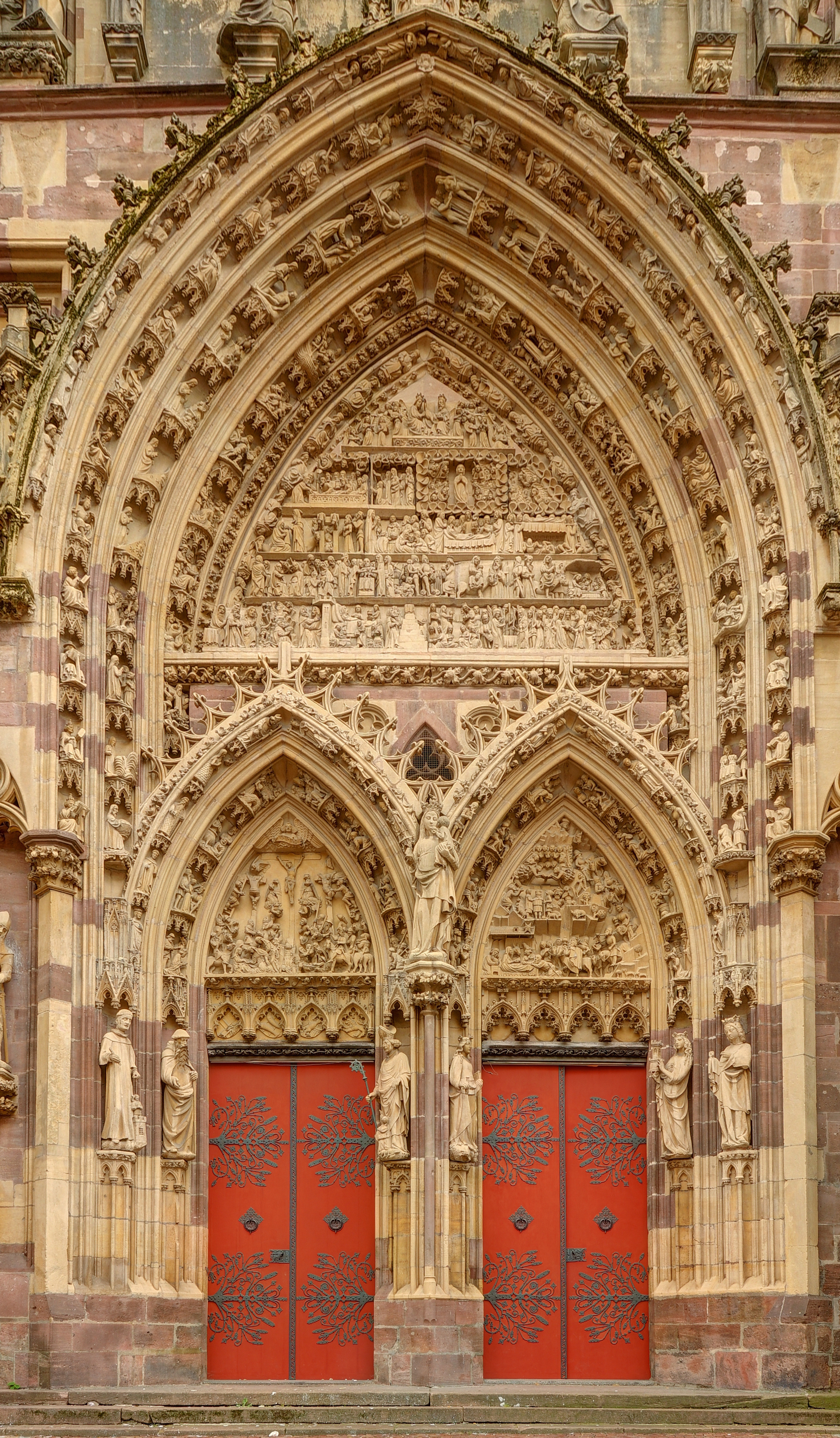
Collégiale - Detail of the West Front

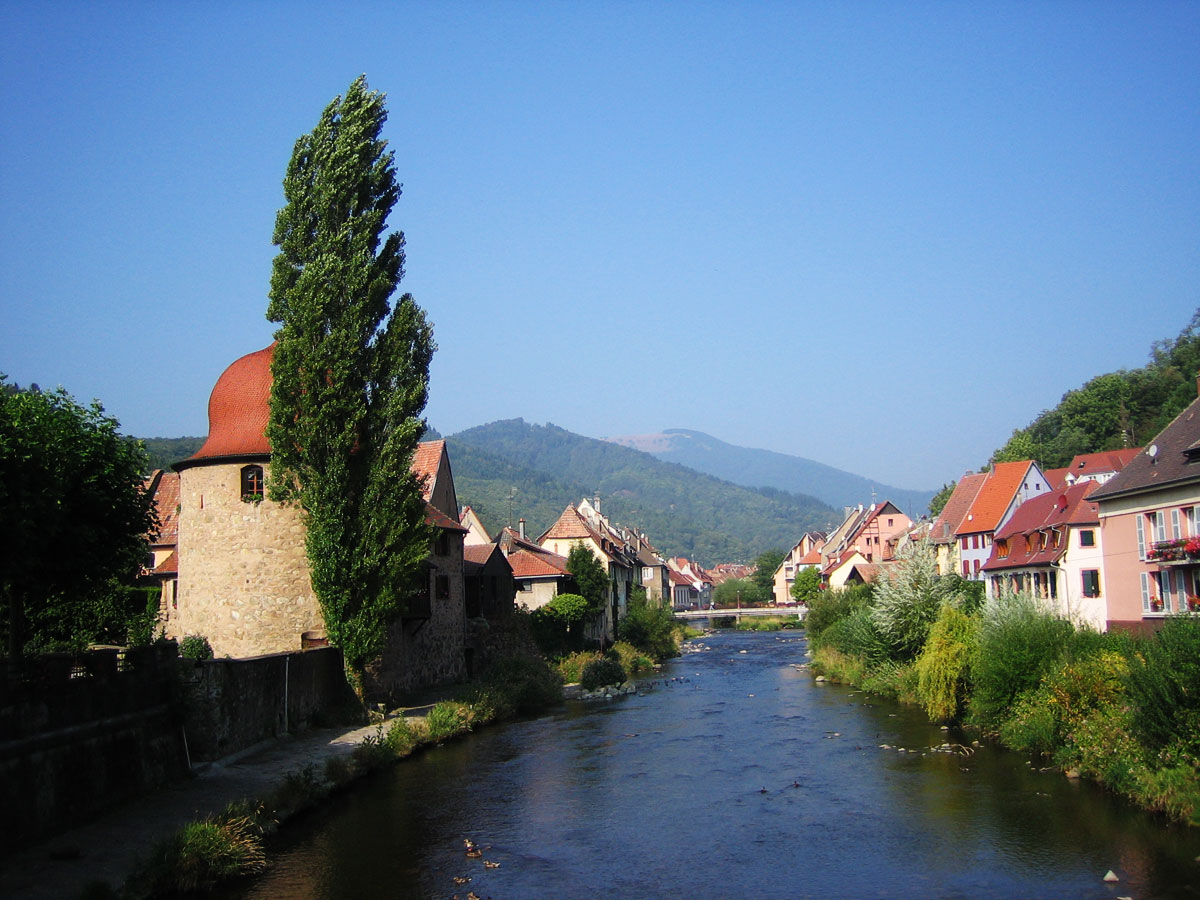
La Tour des Sorcières (left) and the River Thur

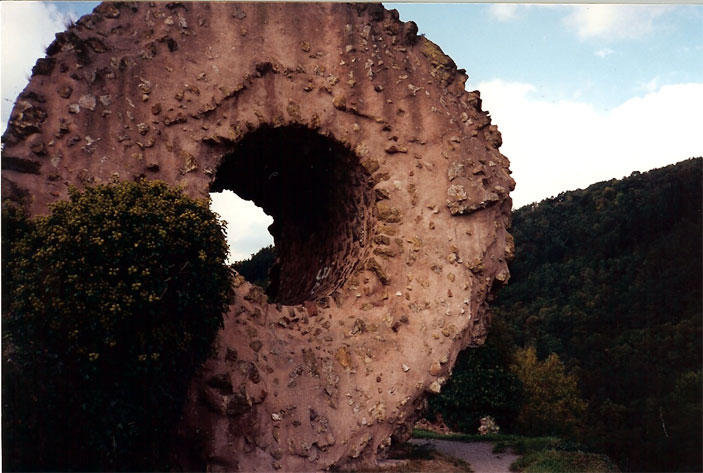
L'oeil de la sorcière

== Toponymy ==
The town's name comes from the German word Tanne, meaning fir tree. A fir tree does indeed appear on the coat of arms of Thann (canting arms).

- Villa Danne, 10th century;
- Castrum Tanne, 1251;
- Oppidum Thanna, 1304;
- Dan, 16th century;
- Pinetum, by Jérôme Gebwiller (1473–1545), probably because the coat of arms of Thann features a fir tree;
- Tann, Nazi period (1940–1945).

== History ==
In 1635, during the Thirty Years' War, Thann was taken by imperialist forces. A mercenary among those troops described it as a "beautiful city, which lies on a mountain and is strongly fortified."

== Transport ==
Thann is 43 km from Colmar and 21 km from Mulhouse. The town is also well situated for the French autoroute network such as the A35 and A36.

The RN66 (Route Nationale 66) passes through Thann, providing an east–west route between Mulhouse and Épinal.

- Thann and the Thur valley are served by regular TER trains on a branch line running from Mulhouse to Kruth.
- A new tram-train service of the Mulhouse tramway links Thann to the city centre of Mulhouse.

== Demographic evolution ==
Historical population
Year	Pop.	±% p.a.
1968	8,318	—
1975	8,519	+0.34%
1982	7,788	−1.27%
1990	7,751	−0.06%
1999	8,033	+0.40%
2007	7,973	−0.09%
2012	7,931	−0.11%
2017	7,780	−0.38%
2023	7,762	−0.04%
Source: INSEE

== Architectural heritage ==
Despite sustaining heavy damage in World War I and World War II, Thann contains several old buildings and monuments of significance.

=== La Collégiale Saint-Thiébaut ===
Situated in the centre of the old town, the church known as the Collégiale is good example of the style of Gothic architecture that flourished in the Rhine valley in the late Middle Ages. The Cathedrals of Strasbourg and Freiburg in Germany are also built in a similar style.

The building owes its name "La collégiale" to the college of monks who moved to Thann from the nearby town of Saint-Amarin in 1442. Construction of the collégiale took more than 200 years, from the end of the 13th Century through the 15th Century, and was completed in 1516 with the 78m tall spire.

For an extensive study of the Thann collegiate church, circumstances of its erection, issues of patronage, and unique sculptural programs, see Assaf Pinkus, Workshops and Patrons of St. Theobald in Thann (Waxmann Verlag: Muenster, Berlin, New York, 2006).

=== La Tour des Sorcières (The Witches' Tower) ===
This was a tower in the old town walls, and built in 1411. The bulbous roof dates from 1628. Today the interior houses a museum dedicated to winemaking.

=== Le Château de l'Engelbourg (Engelbourg Castle) ===
The ruins of the Engelbourg Castle sit on a hill to the north of the old town. The castle was constructed in the 13th century by the Counts of Ferrette to control the entrance to the valley and ensure the paying of tolls by those wishing to cross the Vosges by way of the Thur valley and the col de Bussang. The castle was destroyed on the orders of Louis XIV. During demolition, one of towers overturned and cracked into sections, one of which forms a large stone ring known locally today as The Witch's Eye (L'œil de la sorcière).

=== L'Hôtel de Ville ===
The Hotel de Ville was originally conceived as a hospital, but was opened as a town hall in 1793.

== Education ==
The town is served by four écoles maternelles; three écoles élémentaires; two collèges (Collège Charles Walch and Collège Rémy Faesch); and two lycées (Lycée Professionel Charles Pointet and Lycée Scheurer-Kestner).

== Tourism ==
- Thann is the southern terminus of the route des Vins d'Alsace. The northern side of the town is overlooked by the Rangen vineyard, one of the few vineyards in Alsace to be classed grand cru.
- Thann is well situated for access to the Parc naturel régional des Ballons des Vosges.

== People ==
- Ernst Robert Curtius, literary critic
- Emmanuel Fernandes, politician
- Jean-Baptiste-Joseph Gobel

== Twin towns ==
- - Gubbio, Italy
- - Tonneins, France

== See also ==
- Communes of the Haut-Rhin department
