= Guillaume-François Colson =

French painter

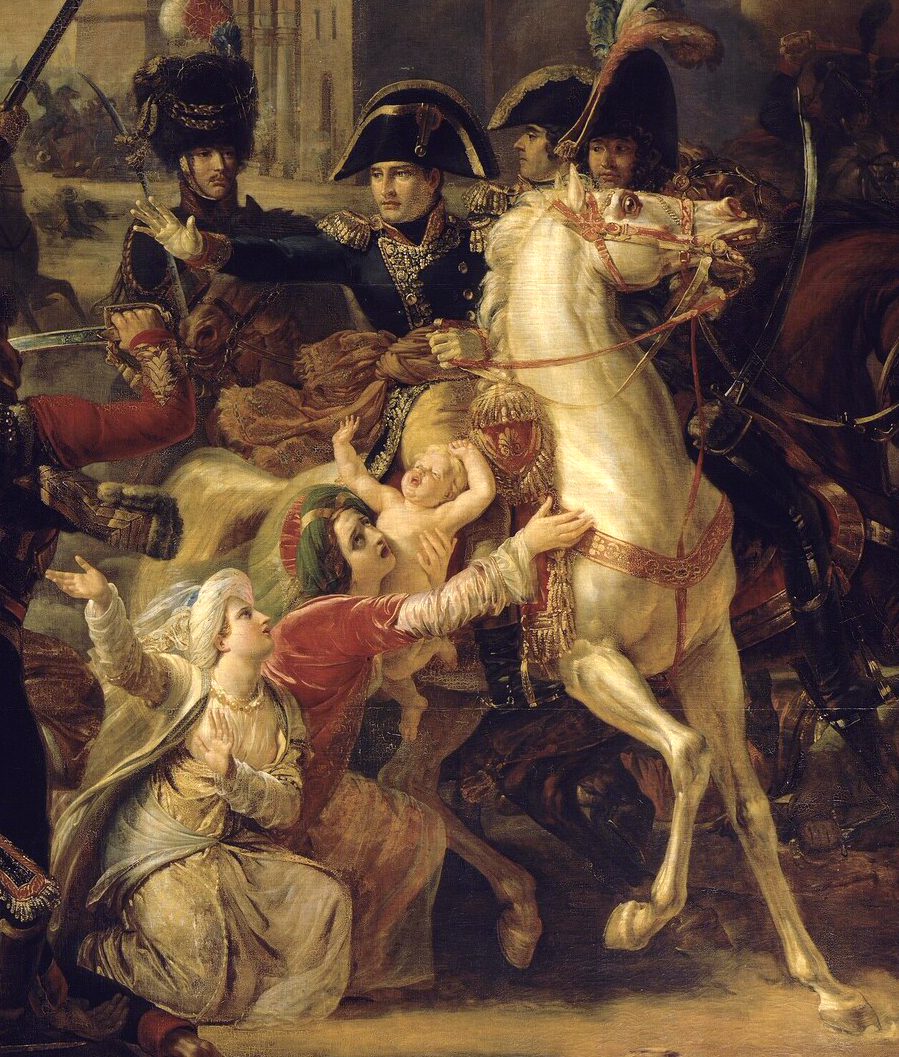
Entry of General Bonaparte into Alexandria, oil on canvas, 3.65 × 5 meters, c. 1800, Versailles

Guillaume François Colson (1785 - 1860) was a French historical painter, and pupil of Jacques-Louis David. He was born and died in Paris.

Among other works, he painted the 'Entry of General Bonaparte into Alexandria,' which is at Versailles.

He also painted various family portraits and scenes of the upper classes in his idle moments, which could be seen as forerunners to artists such as Boudin and the Impressionists who were working decades later.
