= Antoine Philippe de La Trémoille =

French royalist

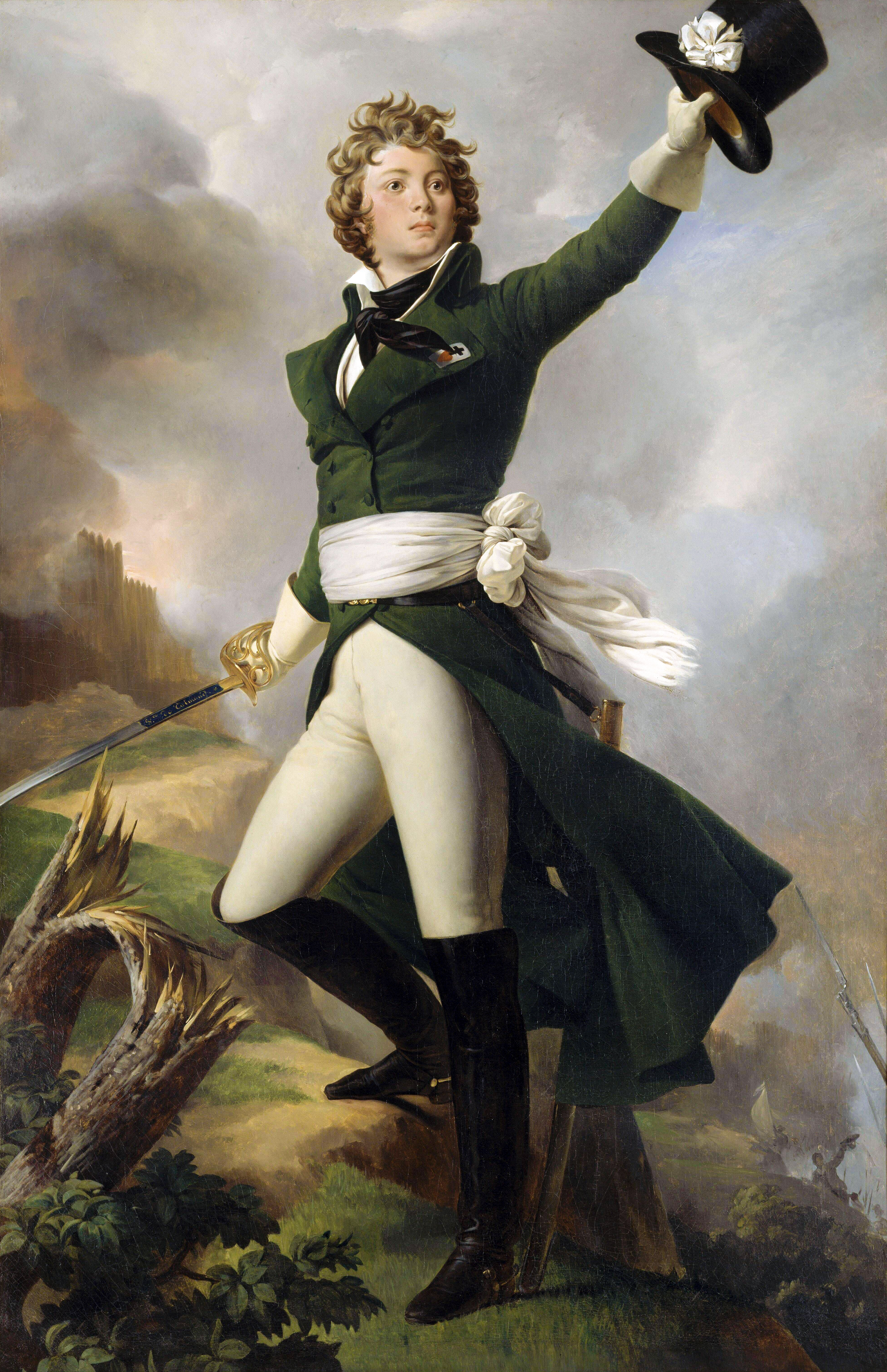
- Portrait by Léon Cogniet
- Born: 27 September 1765; Paris, France
- Died: 27 January 1794 (aged 28); Laval
- Relatives: La Trémoille
- Military career
- Allegiance: Kingdom of France; Véndéens
- Rank: General
- Nickname: Talmont
- Conflicts: War in the Vendée; Battle of Nantes; Battle of Cholet; Virée de Galerne

Antoine Philippe de La Trémoïlle, Prince of Talmont (French pronunciation: [ɑ̃twan filip də la tʁemuj]; 27 September 1765 – 27 January 1794) was a French noble and royalist notable for his military involvement against the French Revolution.

== Early life ==
Antoine Philippe de La Trémoïlle was Prince of Talmont (referred to as "Talmont") and second son of Jean Bretagne Charles de La Trémoille, 8th duc de Thouars, last count of Laval and baron de Vitré et de Marie-Maximilienne-Louise de Salm-Kyrbourg. He resided in the Castle of Laval, and was a commander of the cavalry of catholic and royal armies during the French Revolution.

He married Henriette-Louise-Françoise-Angélique d'Argouges on 23 January 1785.

== The Poitou Confederation and emigration ==
Until the end of 1791, Talmont was noticed for his restless character. He joined counterrevolutionary circles (the Poitou Confederation) in Poitou at the end of 1791. It was a failure which resulted in his emigration to England to secure the interests of his party. He then went to the Rhine and joined émigrés. He, together with the count Marie Pierre Louis de Frotté, took service with the Chevaliers-dragons de la couronne. His first campaign was as aide-de-camp to the Count of Artois (the future Charles X of France). He was sent to France with a new plan for insurrection in the western provinces.

At the execution of the king, Louis XVI, he hoped to start a movement in Paris. Having failed in this, he settled in the village of Boulogne, close to Paris, with his twin brother the abbot Charles-Godefroy de La Trémoille. Upon learning about the counterrevolution movement of a part of Brittany and Maine, which preceded that of Vendée, on March 10, he procured a passport with a false name, and another in the name of his brother. He travelled through Normandy, Maine and Anjou to recruit partisans.

== Royalist insurrection ==
Talmont was arrested on 20 May by the municipality of Noyant-sous-le-Lude, and sent from there to Baugé, then transferred to a prison in Angers; the Committee of Public Safety was informed of his confinement there. His brother, abbot of Trémoille, managed to organize a conspiracy to free him within the National Convention. Chambon, a member of The Mountain, was designated to interrogate the prince and, under the pretext of bringing him back to Paris, to deliver him to the Vendeans. He managed to escape through this plan conceived by his brother.

During his transfer from Angers to Laval, Talmont's own guards allowed his escape, and peasants escorted him towards Saumur, which was then held by the royalist Vendéens since June 1793 (see Battle of Saumur). In one of his interrogations, he said he was simply released by the Maine-et-Loire department. His arrival in Saumur caused a huge sensation. Talmont was named commander of the cavalry of the Catholic and Royal Army and took part in the superior council of the army.

== Vendée ==
At the victory in Nantes, on 28 June 1793, Talmont proved his courage along with Jacques Cathelineau and Maurice d'Elbée, by checking the ranks, bringing back to combat discouraged Vendéens and by being wounded whilst leading the charge of the royal cavalry. Back in Vendée, he participated in nearly every action in the first stages of the war. After the First Battle of Châtillon, and the repeated defeats of the Vendéens, he insisted that they should at least become masters of the Loire passage and entrance in Brittany.

During the crisis in which the army of Vendée was pushed back towards the Loire, the Prince of Talmont was detached with 4,000 royalists to guard the Saint-Florent post. After the Battle of Cholet, he concentrated on protecting the road of the Vendéens on the right bank of the Loire.

== Virée de Galerne ==
In the council, Talmont opposed the resolution of entering Vendée, thinking it better to head to Saint-Malo, where they could receive aid promised by the English. The ancient authority of his family in the country around Laval ordered the army to march in that direction.

The first Chouans joined the Vendéens at their arrival at Laval, and a considerable troop was recruited called Petite-Vendée, which followed the army under the son of the previous count of Laval. Antoine Philippe, along with Donnissant and the abbot Bernier, signed at Laval for £900,000 in paper money. He participated in the victory of the Battle of Entrames.

Their determination being successful, with Fleuriot he took command of the column marching from Laval to Vitré, where he hoped to recruit more troops, and retreated back to the royal army in Fougères which marched to the Cotentin and besieged Granville.

Taking the town depended on the issue of Francis Rawdon-Hastings' expedition, in charge of helping the royalists, who was one day before sailing from England to Jersey. But already the Vendéens were pushed back during their attack on Granville. Discouraged they wanted to retreat back to Vendée and were even in revolt against their leaders. In this confusion, Antoine Philippe along with Beauvollier, de Solérac and Étienne-Alexandre Bernier, took the coast to sail off.

Hearing the news, the Vendéens were indignant, considering the prince's act as desertion. They detached a cavalry unit under Stofflet to stop him. The detachment encircled the prince and returned him to the camp with those who had followed him. "They had only chartered," they said, "a fishing boat for Jersey, in order to hasten the arrival of help from England, and to save some women." Other testimonies differed on the intention of the projected escape of the prince.

A few days later, the prince gave new examples of his valor in the Battle of Dol; he alone, when most divisions of the royal army were fleeing to Dol, held firmly with a few men until Henri de La Rochejaquelein joined him. Talmont followed the army at the siege of Angers, which was as disastrous as in Granville. In the Battle of Le Mans on 14 December, he charged under fire the enemy hussars at the entrance of the town. After his defeat, the royal army, unable to retreat to the Loire, had lost 7,000 men.

== Illusions ==
Bravely but without any illusions, he continued fighting with what was left of the Catholic and Royal Army which had been unable to recross the Loire. He joined with Henri de La Rochejaquelein who had crossed the river at Ancenis with the other chiefs, and came to find his troops at Blain to bring them back.

Upon Fleuriot's appointment as chief general, Talmont left the army, angry that Fleuriot was preferred over him. He considered himself free of any obligations and left through Derval, La Guerche and the Pertre forest to join Jean Chouan or to head to the coast. Some Bretons enlisted by Joseph de Puisaye could not give him any information about the Chouans in Mayenne; Puisaye himself showed no eagerness to enter into relations with the prince. The latter continued his journey towards Normandy.

== Arrest ==
On 31 December 1793, in the village of Malagra, Talmont was walking through fields near Laval and Fougères, in the company of three men, dressed as a peasant, when he stumbled upon the national guard of La Bazouge-du-Désert. A sum of £30,000 was found on them, as well as a few luxury items, and a passport stamped four days before by the Ernée municipality.

General Beaufort had them sent to him at Fougères, without anyone knowing who they were. A young girl in Saint-Jacques, seeing them pass, cried out: "it's the prince of Talmont!" Beaufort interrogated him first.

He was transferred to Rennes on 2 January 1794 and underwent a long interrogation by François Joachim Esnue-Lavallée, after which the prisoner asked for his transfer to Paris in a letter to the National Convention. Chained, he was thrown into a cell where he wrote to general Rossignol. Administrators, generals, commissioners, insulted their victims, especially the prince. But they were frightened that the prince, infected with typhus, would die in prison. The order came to transfer him to Paris.

Esnue-Lavallée put him on trial to the Vaugeois commission in Vitré, on 26 January. He arrived there almost dying, was subject to a new interrogation which he refused to sign, and waited to be trialed in front of the National Convention. He was immediately sentenced to death, protested the following day and asked for a transfer to Paris having ideas of general pacification to present. Instead of that, the commission took six artillery horses to transport him to Laval.

It is said that Jean Chouan attempted to save him, but he was misinformed. The convoy, heavily escorted, arrived in Laval at nightfall and the execution took place then and there. His head was subject to different desecration, it was placed on a chandelier by Jean-Louis Guilbert, former priest and member of the revolutionary commission, then it was put on a pike and exposed over the gates of the Laval castle. Two days later, the prince's head was buried in the courtyard of the castle.

His only son became colonel of the 5th regiment of Hussars, and died on 7 November 1815.

== Ancestry ==
Ancestors of Antoine Philippe de La Trémoille

16. Charles Belgique Hollande de La Trémoille
8. Charles Louis Bretagne de La Trémoille
17. Madeleine de Créquy
4. Charles Armand René de La Trémoille
18. Rene Armand de La Fayette
9. Marie Madeleine Motier de La Fayette
19. Marie-Madeleine de Marillac
2. Jean Bretagne Charles de La Trémoille
20. Godefroy Maurice de La Tour d'Auvergne, Duke of Bouillon
10. Emmanuel Théodose de La Tour d'Auvergne, Duke of Bouillon
21. Marie Anne Mancini
5. Marie Hortense de La Tour d'Auvergne
22. Charles Belgique Hollande de La Trémoille =16
11. Marie Armande Victoire de La Trémoille
23. Madeleine de Créquy =17
1. Antoine Philippe de La Trémoille
24. -
12. Hendrik Gabriel Joseph, regent of Salm-Kyrburg
25. -
6. Philip Joseph, Prince of Salm-Kyrburg
26. -
13. Maria Theresia of Croÿ
27. -
3. Marie Maximilienne Louise de Salm-Kyrbourg
28. -
14. -
29. -
7. Maria Theresa of Hornes
30. -
15. -
31. -

== Sources ==
- "Antoine-Philippe de La Trémoïlle" in Louis-Gabriel Michaud, ed. Biographie universelle ancienne et moderne: histoire par ordre alphabétique de la vie publique et privée de tous les hommes avec la collaboration de plus de 300 savants et littérateurs français ou étrangers, 2e édition, 1843–1865
- "Antoine-Philippe de La Trémoïlle" in Alphonse-Victor Angot; Ferdinand Gaugain, eds.,Dictionnaire historique, topographique et biographique de la Mayenne, Goupil, 1900–1910
