= Georges Cadoudal =

French royalist rebel (1771–1804)

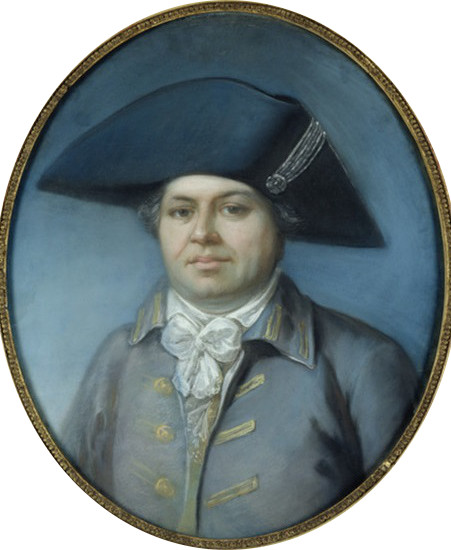
- Portrait by Joseph Ducreux, c. 1800
- Nickname: "Gédéon"
- Born: 1 January 1771; Brech, Brittany, France
- Died: 25 June 1804 (aged 33) Paris, France
- Allegiance: Kingdom of France; Chouans
- Branch: Catholic and Royal Army
- Service years: 1793–1804
- Rank: Marshal of France (posthumous); General
- Conflicts: War in the Vendée; Battle of Nantes; Second Battle of Cholet; Virée de Galerne; Battle of Granville; Siege of Angers; Battle of Le Mans; Battle of Savenay; Battle of Quiberon; Chouannerie

Georges Cadoudal (Breton: Jorj Kadoudal; 1 January 1771 – 25 June 1804), sometimes called simply Georges, was a Breton counter-revolutionary and leader of the Chouannerie during the French Revolution. He was posthumously named a Marshal of France in 1814 by the reinstated Bourbons. Cadoudal means in Breton language "warrior returning from the fight".

== Biography ==
Born in Brech, in Brittany, after completing his education, he remained true to his Royalist and Roman Catholic convictions during the start of the Revolution. From 1793 he organized a rebellion in the Morbihan against the National Convention of the First Republic. It was quickly suppressed, and he thereupon joined the army of the Vendée insurrection, taking part in the battles of Le Mans and of Savenay in December of the same year.

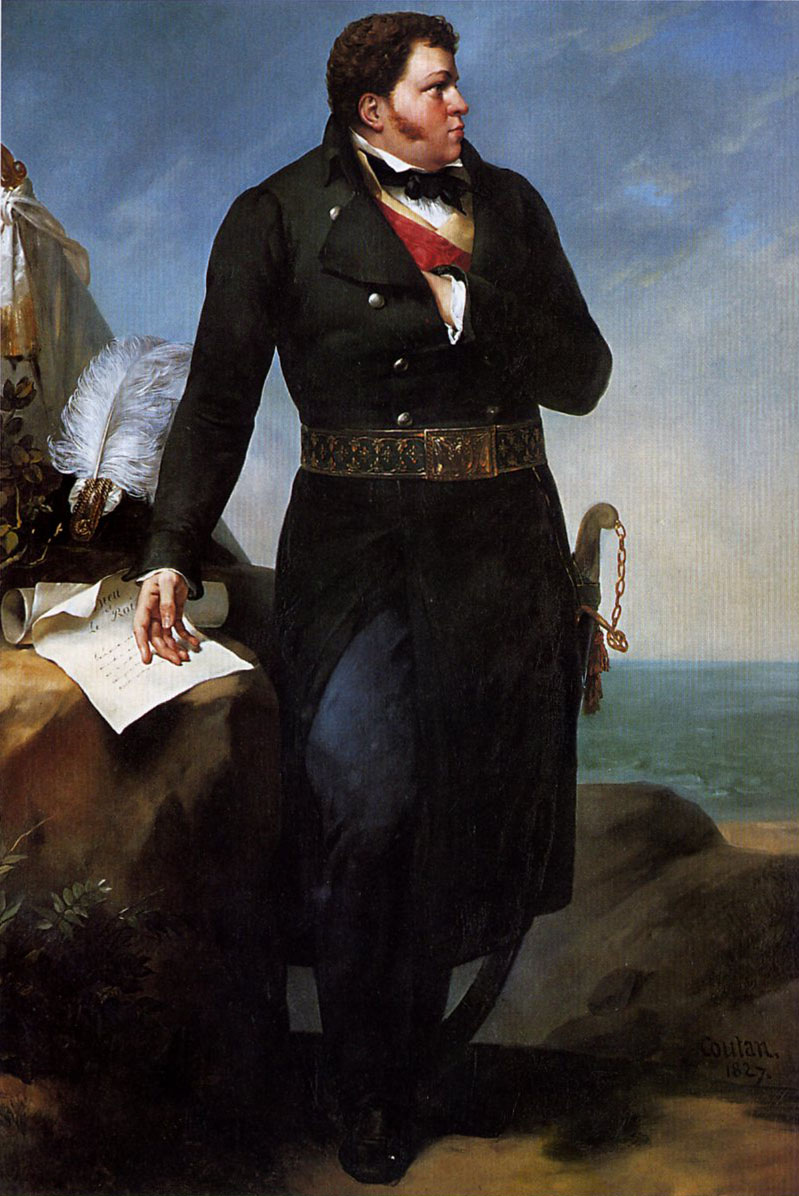
Portrait by Amable-Paul Coutan, 1827

Returning to Morbihan, he was arrested, and imprisoned at Brest. He succeeded, however, in escaping, and began again the struggle against the Revolution. In spite of the defeat of his party, and of the fact that he was forced several times to take refuge in England, Cadoudal did not cease both to wage war and to conspire in favour of the Royalist pretender Louis, count of Provence. In 1799 he was a regular visitor at Mont Orgueil, Jersey where he would meet Philippe d'Auvergne, a British spymaster. He refused to come to any understanding with the government, although offers were made to him by Napoleon Bonaparte, who admired his skill and his obstinate energy.

From 1800 it was impossible for Cadoudal to continue to wage open war, so he centered his efforts on conspiracies. In December, he was indirectly involved in an attempt on the life of the First Consul, led by Pierre Robinault de Saint-Régeant in the Plot of the Rue Saint-Nicaise, and fled to England again.

On the night of 23 August 1803, HMS Vincejo landed Georges and several other Chouans at the foot of the cliffs of Biville. The conspirators wanted to undertake a new kidnap or assassination attempt on Bonaparte whilst on the road to Malmaison. Although under nominal police surveillance, he succeeded in eluding pursuit for six months, but was arrested for long periods. Found guilty and sentenced to death, he refused to ask for pardon and was guillotined in Paris, along with eleven of his companions. Before being executed, he shouted to the crowd: "And now, it's time to show to the Parisians how Christians, Royalists and Bretons die".

During the Bourbon Restoration in 1814, Cadoudal was made a Marshal of France posthumously by Louis XVIII.

Cadoudal features as a main character in the 1940 Rafael Sabatini novel, The Marquis of Carabas (also known as Master-At-Arms). He is also portrayed in The Companions of Jehu and The Knight of Sainte-Hermine by Alexandre Dumas, père.
