= Battle of La Flèche =

1793 military engagement in Sarthe, France

- Part of the War in the Vendée
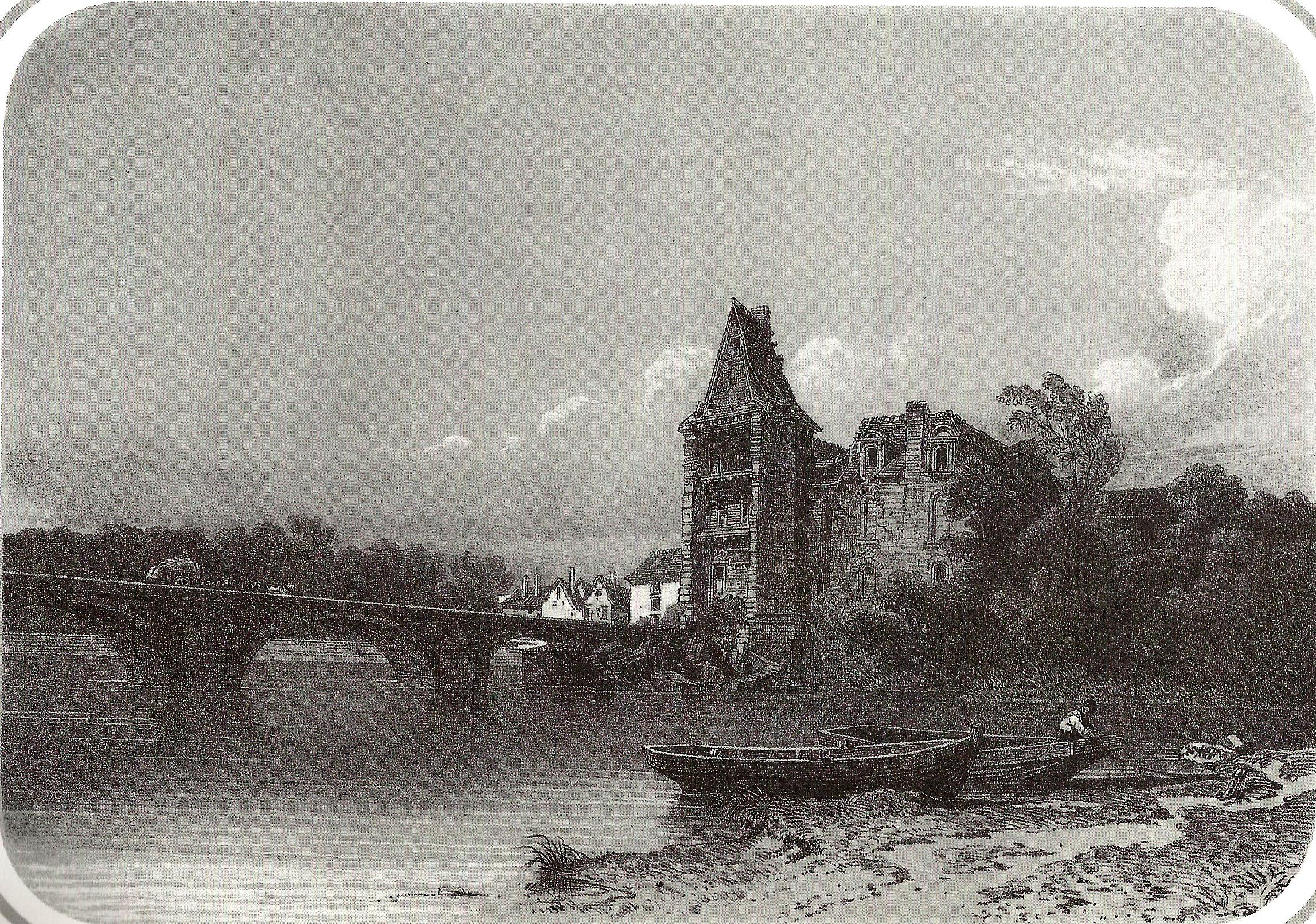
- Remains of the Château de La Flèche, engraving by Thomas Drake, 1860.
Date	8–11 December 1793
Location	La Flèche, Sarthe, France 47.6981°N 0.0755°W
Result	Vendéan victory

Belligerents
(France) French Republic	Catholic and Royal Army; Chouans

Commanders and leaders
Louis Chabot	Henri de La Rochejaquelein; Piron de La Varenne

Strength
1,500–2,000 men	15,000–20,000 men

The Battle of La Flèche (8–11 December 1793) was a military engagement during the War in the Vendée, a significant episode of the French Revolution. It took place in La Flèche, Sarthe, France.

== Background ==
Following the failure of the Virée de Galerne at Granville, the Vendéan army sought to cross the Loire River to return to the Vendée. Repelled at the Siege of Angers, the disorganized Vendéans, pursued by 5,000 republican troops under François-Joseph Westermann, retreated toward La Flèche to regroup and resupply. The town was held by 1,500 republican soldiers led by Louis François Jean Chabot, and the bridge over the Loir River had been destroyed, leaving the Vendéans vulnerable to attack from Westermann’s forces.

Last night, I discussed the Vendéan brigands with Richard, La Flèche’s postmaster and a refugee. Citizen Lamotte arrived with a letter from Madame Richard, reporting:

When the enemy entered La Flèche, panic erupted with cries of "Save yourselves!" Hiding in a street, I saw their 20,000–25,000-strong force, over half women, children, and sick, in a pitiful state. They abandoned a near-dead child in a field, whom I saved. They looted patriots’ homes, taking only grain, hay, and provisions from aristocrats, leaving spoiled forage in streets and gardens. After their departure, pursued by the Army of Mainz to Durtal, I returned to La Flèche and found three exhausted Catholics in a stable, who were killed for shouting "Long live the king, long live our priests!" instead of republican slogans. Their priests said over 200 masses daily. The army spread disease, requiring vinegar to cleanse rooms. Several died of starvation, and 60–80 were killed, with Iteau’s son’s house reduced to walls.

Lamotte noted discontent among Vendéans against their leaders and no killings, as only women and children remained. Le Lude is guarded, raising 500 men but lacking weapons. There’s no immediate danger. D’Autichamp lost an arm, and 2,000 dead were found on the road to Durtal. I couldn’t meet Lefèvre, the Vendôme commissioner, absent from the surveillance committee. Please confirm receipt of my package and this letter.

— Report by Blavette to the Château-du-Loir administration

== The Battle ==
Henri de La Rochejaquelein dispatched Piron de La Varenne with a detachment to delay Westermann’s republican cavalry. Leading 400 cavalry and 400 infantry mounted behind them, La Rochejaquelein scouted the Loir River, located a ford, and attacked Chabot’s forces from the rear. Caught off guard, Chabot’s troops fled. After repairing the bridge, La Rochejaquelein reinforced Piron, forcing the republicans to retreat. This victory secured the Vendéans two days to rest and regroup.

On 10 December, the Vendéans departed for Le Mans, leaving their sick at the hospital, where they were massacred by republican soldiers. Westermann’s vanguard captured La Flèche, killing stragglers. He reported 700 Vendéans “killed and massacred,” including 100 in the town and 600 in surrounding villages.

D’Obenheim reports the Vendéan army at Baugé was attacked by republican chasseurs the day after arriving, repelling them but tiring the poorly organized troops. Expecting to march on Saumur, they redirected to La Flèche upon learning of Kléber’s advancing division.

Many soldiers, believing only their leaders were targeted and travel passports were no longer needed, planned to desert, discarding rifles for sticks to gain republican hospitality. They followed the army, seeking escape.

As the Vendéans neared La Flèche, chasseurs attacked their rear, causing chaos. The broken bridge and republican cannons could have been fatal if the chasseurs were stronger, but they only harassed the rear. The Vendéan vanguard shot the bridge’s gunners, crossed the river via two boats near a mill, and forced a republican retreat as night fell. La Rochejaquelein’s 200–300 men drove off the defenders.

Securing La Flèche, La Rochejaquelein repelled the chasseurs, who retreated to a village. The bridge was repaired, allowing cannon crossings at dawn. While resting, chasseurs looted carts, but La Rochejaquelein drove them back, losing men. The unsupported vanguard weakened, and chasseurs with horse artillery nearly routed the Vendéans before withdrawing, leaving many dead and fear of republican forces.

Over 30 sick or wounded Vendéans died of cold on carts outside town, a grim sight. That evening, a weak republican force on the Le Mans road further exhausted the army. Another chasseur attack could have been devastating. Noticing disarmament at Baugé, leaders restricted supplies to those with rifles.

— D’Obenheim

Yesterday at 1 p.m., we were attacked at La Flèche by about 18,000 Vendéans; fierce fighting lasted until 6 p.m. Heavy fire was heard behind the enemy, likely the Army of Mainz in pursuit. Too weak to hold, Chabot ordered a retreat to Fouilletourte. The next day, he advanced but, fearing encirclement after cannon fire, withdrew to Le Mans, which was attacked and captured on the 10th.

— Garnier de Saintes

On 20 December, we camped a league from La Flèche, where the enemy had repaired the bridge and held the town. That night, I had their outposts killed; our army planned to attack via Turtalle. At dawn, the enemy fled to Le Mans, cutting the bridge. By 7 a.m., my cavalry swam the river, and 300 infantry crossed using beams, planks, and boats. We killed several hundred brigands in the town, capturing cannons, caissons, and carts. Pursuing to Fulturte, we found the road littered with corpses and slaughtered over 600 brigands in nearby villages and farms that night.

— François-Joseph Westermann

On 11 December, General Jean-Baptiste Kléber entered La Flèche, finding 300 sick or wounded “brigands,” all of whom died from lack of care, according to him. However, H. Le Prestre de Châteaugiron claimed they were “all massacred that day and thrown into the street, where I saw them.”

21 Frimaire (11 December). Arrived at La Flèche. The next day, my column entered, finding nearly 300 sick or wounded brigands at the Jesuit college, all dead or dying from neglect and buried locally. Townspeople reported over 12,000 women, priests, and non-combatants with the exhausted, dysentery-stricken Vendéan army. Leaders took goods from shops, paying with their own assignats.

— Jean-Baptiste Kléber

== Casualties ==
Among the fallen was Vendéan leader Mathieu de Verteuil, killed when both legs were torn off by a cannonball.

== See also ==
- Virée de Galerne
- Siege of Angers
- Battle of Le Mans (1793)
- Catholic and Royal Army
- French Revolution
- Chouannerie

== Bibliography ==
- Chardin, Henri (1871). Les Vendéens dans la Sarthe [The Vendéans in Sarthe] (in French). Le Mans: Imprimerie Edmond Monnoyer.
- Chassin, Charles-Louis (1892). La préparation de la guerre de Vendée 1789-1793 [The Preparation of the War in the Vendée 1789–1793] (in French). Vol. III. Paris: Imprimerie Paul Dupont.
- Chassin, Charles-Louis (1893). La Vendée Patriote (1793-1800) [The Patriotic Vendée (1793–1800)] (in French). Vol. III. Paris: Paul Dupont. p. 405.
- Fournier, Émile (1984). La Terreur bleue: 15 octobre-23 décembre 1793: La virée de galerne [The Blue Terror: 15 October–23 December 1793: The Virée de Galerne] (in French). Paris: Albin Michel. ISBN 978-2-226-01985-1.
- Gabory, Émile (2009) [1912]. Les Guerres de Vendée [The Wars of the Vendée] (in French). Paris: Robert Laffont. pp. 311–312. ISBN 978-2-221-11309-7.
- Gras, Yves (1994). La guerre de Vendée: 1793-1796 [The War in the Vendée: 1793–1796] (in French). Paris: Economica. p. 112. ISBN 978-2-717-82600-5.
- Kléber, Jean-Baptiste (1989). Mémoires politiques et militaires 1793-1794 [Political and Military Memoirs 1793–1794] (in French). Paris: Tallandier. ISBN 978-2-235-01829-6.
- Poirier de Beauvais, Bertrand (1893). Mémoires inédits de Bertrand Poirier de Beauvais, commandant général de l'artillerie des armées de la Vendée [Unpublished Memoirs of Bertrand Poirier de Beauvais, Commander-in-Chief of the Artillery of the Vendée Armies] (in French). Cholet: Éditions Pays et Terroirs. pp. 211–213.
- Savary, Jean Julien Michel (1824). Guerres des Vendéens et des Chouans contre la République [Wars of the Vendéans and Chouans Against the Republic] (in French). Vol. II. Paris: Baudouin Frères.
- Westermann, François-Joseph (1794). Campagnes de la Vendée du général de brigade Westermann [Campaigns in the Vendée by Brigadier General Westermann] (in French). Paris: Imprimerie de la République.
