= Catholic and Royal Army of Anjou and Haut-Poitou =

- Armée catholique et royale d'Anjou et du Haut-Poitou
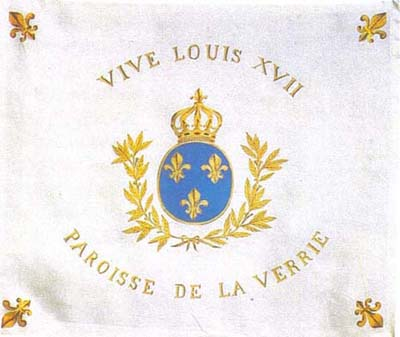
- Type of flag of the Catholic and Royal army, parish company of La Verrie.
- Active: 1793–1800
- Allegiance: Kingdom of France
- Size: 40,000
- Motto(s): Pour Dieu et le Roi (lit. 'For God and the King')
- Engagements: War in the Vendée; Battle of Nantes; Virée de Galerne

The Catholic and Royal Army of Anjou (French: Armée catholique et royale d'Anjou) or Catholic and Royal Army of Anjou and Haut-Poitou (French: Armée catholique et royale d'Anjou et du Haut-Poitou), also nicknamed the Grande Armée (lit. 'Grand Army'), was the largest royalist army during the War in the Vendée against the French First Republic. It was formed and operated in the northern and eastern parts of the coastal region.

The army's mobilization capacity was 40,000 men. Although the unit had permanent organization, it was very loose. The army was organized into divisions that grouped parish companies, with no intermediate units.

The army successfully stormed Saumur on 9 June 1793. On June 12, Jacques Cathelineau was elected the army commander. Then, the highest-level Royalist commanders decided to attack Nantes, but the attack in the end of June failed due to the lack of coordination between the army of Anjou and Haut-Poitou and the army of Pays de Retz and Bas-Poitou. Cathelineau died in the fighting in Nantes.

== Order of Battle ==
Order of Battle in March–July 1793
Division of	Divisional general	Strength
Saint-Florent-le-Vieil	Charles de Bonchamps, later Jacques Cathelineau	12,000
Cholet and Beaupréau	Maurice d'Elbée	9,000
Maulévrier	Jean-Nicolas Stofflet	3,000
Châtillon-sur-Sèvre	Henri de la Rochejaquelein	7,000
Bressuire	Louis Marie de Lescure	6,000
Argenton-les-Vallées	de Laugrenière	2,000
Loroux	François Lyrot	3,000

== General Staff ==
In June 1794, the army's general staff was reorganized:

Role	Person
General in Chief	Jean-Nicolas Stofflet
Lieutenant General	La Bouëre
Major General	Trottouin
Chief of Cavalry	Rostaing
Chief of Infantry	Berrard
Chief of Artillery	Bertrand Poirier de Beauvais
Secretary-general	Henri Michel Gibert
Commissioner-General, responsible for civil affairs	Abbot Étienne-Alexandre Bernier

== Sources ==
- Berthre de Bourniseaux, Pierre Victor Jean (1819). Histoire des guerres de la Vendée et des Chouans, depuis l'année 1792 jusqu'en 1815 (in French). Vol. I. Paris: Brunot-Labbé.
- Poirier de Beauvais, Bertrand (1893). Mémoires inédits de Bertrand Poirier de Beauvais (in French). Paris: Plon.
- Ross, Steven T. (2010). "Vendée, The". The A to Z of the Wars of the French Revolution. Scarecrow Press. ISBN 9781461672388.
- Harper, Rob (2019). "Chapter 3 - 'For God and the King': The Catholic and Royal Armies". Fighting the French Revolution: The Great Vendée Rising of 1793. Barnsley, Great Britain: Pen & Sword Books. ISBN 9781473868984.
