= Treaty of Breda =

Treaty of Breda may refer to:

- Treaty of Breda (1650), a treaty between Charles II and the Scottish Covenanters during the Wars of the Three Kingdoms
- Treaty of Breda (1667), a treaty between England, the United Provinces (the Netherlands), France, and Denmark to end the Second Anglo-Dutch War

== See also ==
- Congress of Breda (1746-1748), negotiations between Great Britain and France to end the War of the Austrian Succession
- Declaration of Breda, a 1660 declaration by Charles II of England paving the way for the English Restoration
- Siege of Breda (disambiguation)
- The Surrender of Breda, a painting by Diego Velázquez after the 1624 siege of the city
