= Battle of Le Mans (1793) =

Combat in Virée de Galerne

Coordinates: 48.0042°N 0.1969°E

- Part of War in the Vendée
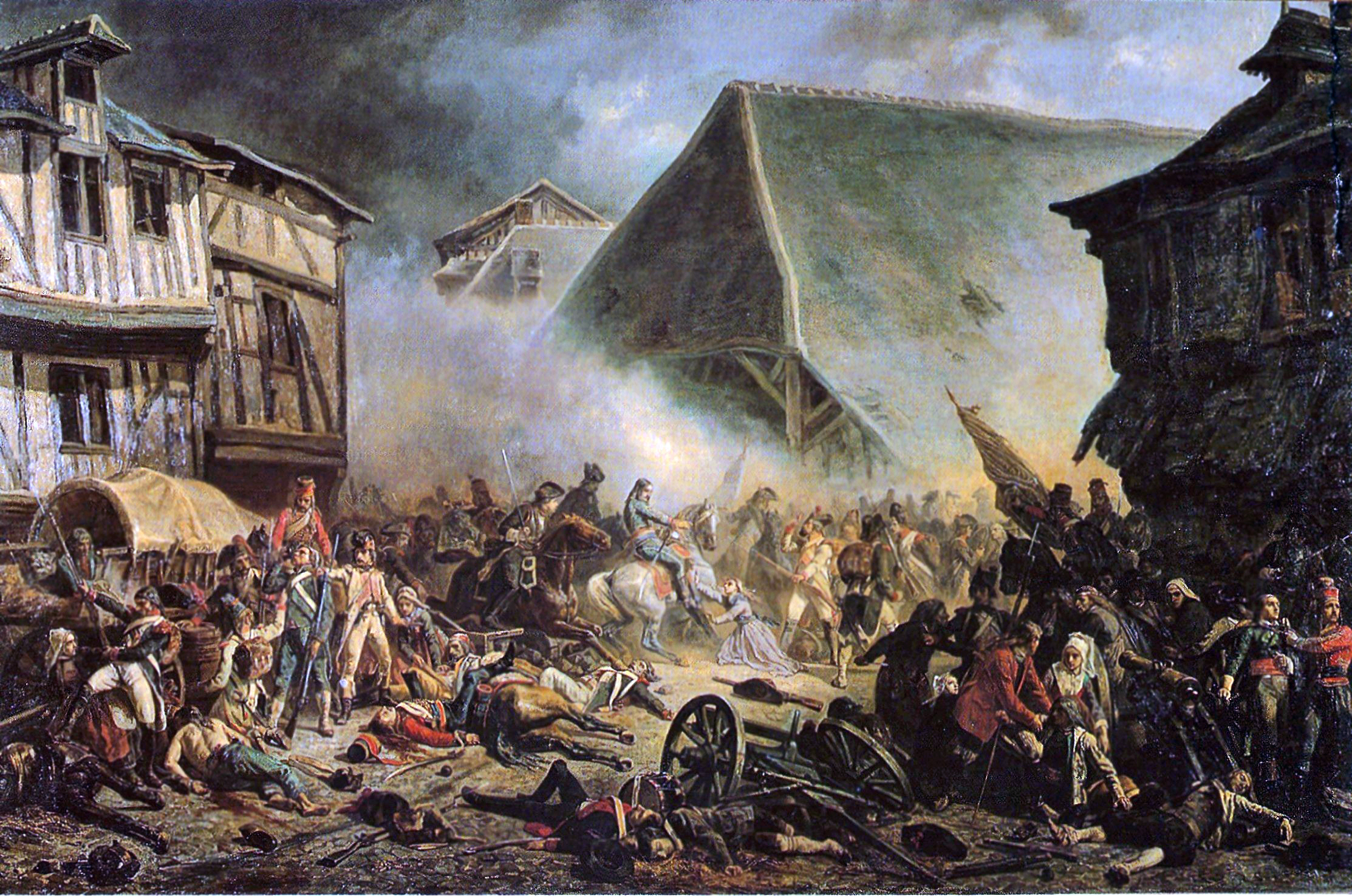
- The Battle of Le Mans, by Jean Sorieul
| Date | 12 and 13 December 1793 |
| Location | Le Mans, France |
| Result | Republican victory |

Belligerents
| Republican France | (Kingdom of France) Vendéens (Kingdom of France) Chouans |

Commanders and leaders
| (France) François Marceau (France) Jean Kléber (France) F.-J. Westermann (France) Jean Moulin | (Kingdom of France) Henri de La Rochejaquelein (Kingdom of France) Jean-Nicolas Stofflet (Kingdom of France) Charles d'Autichamp |

Strength
| 20,000 soldiers | 15,000 soldiers, 30 guns 20,000 non-combatants |

Casualties and losses
| 30 dead, 100 wounded | 15,000 dead |

The Battle of Le Mans was a combat in December 1793 in the Virée de Galerne, an operation of the War in the Vendée during the French Revolution. It resulted in the rout of the Vendéen forces by Republican troops.

== Prelude ==
Victorious at the Battle of La Flèche after their setback at Angers, where they were unable to cross the river Loire, the desperate Vendéens, always sporadically attacked by the Republican cavalry, continued their march towards Le Mans. Their numbers were greatly reduced: the Catholic and Royal Army now numbered less than 20,000 men, and had with it thousands of wounded, women and children. Of the 80,000 the Vendéens had at the start of the Virée de Galerne, only 40,000 remained. Suffering of famine and the cold, ravaged by gangrenous dysentery, typhus and putrid fever, they mostly tried to obtain supplies.

The Vendéens had managed to repel 4,000 Republicans in a half-hour at Pontlieu, but still demoralized and having lost a great part of their weaponry, they took Le Mans on 10 December 1793 at 4:00 in the afternoon. They then spread out through the city and managed to find provisions, supplies and clothes. Nonetheless, morale was still low, sickness continued to ravage the army and the soldiers, disobeying their officers, didn't try to prepare the defenses of the town despite the fact that the Republican army, reorganized since its defeat at Dol, was marching towards the city.

== The battle ==
On 12 December the first Republican troops under François-Joseph Westermann and François Muller appeared at the gates of the city. Henri de La Rochejaquelein and Talmont assembled 3,000 men, especially Chouans, and took on the Republicans. They managed to set a trap in the woods near Le Mans. Westermann's surprised cavalry had to pull back whereas Muller's division panicked and fled after the first shots fired. The Republican army was on the verge of being annihilated when Jacques Louis François Delaistre de Tilly's Army of the Coasts of Cherbourg arrived as reinforcements on the battle field. This time it was the Vendéens who panicked and fled and hid in the city. La Rochejaquelein thus re-entered the city, but his forces were dispersed, most of the Vendéens not even realizing the Republicans were so close, and some soldiers were even drunk.

Some time later, General François-Séverin Marceau arrived in turn at the battle and reassembled his troops at Cérans-Foulletourte. He was followed by Jean Baptiste Kléber and his troops of the Army of Mainz. Marceau wished to wait for Kléber's troops to arrive before attacking but Westermann insisted and launched an attack, Marceau had to follow.

The Republican army entered Le Mans by nightfall, overwhelmed all the Vendéen defences. The Vendéens were completely disorganized, chaos resulted in the city where all night long street skirmishes were taking place.

Henri de la Rochejaquelein, seeing that all was lost, sought only to protect the retreat towards Laval for the survivors. The Vendéens deployed 14 cannons at the gates of the city, managing to cover their retreat and stopping the Republicans.

Yet thousands of Vendéens, most of them non-combatants, were stuck inside the town, having taken refuge in the houses. Groups of resisting Vendéen soldiers were spread across the city. They resisted for a long while, standing their ground until the end of the day. Nonetheless, they were eventually destroyed by the Republican artillery under General François Carpentier, which opened fire on the buildings and houses from where shots were fired.

The battle then turned into a massacre, with the wounded, women and children who had taken refuge in the houses being forced out and massacred. Kléber and Marceau tried to save the prisoners, but could not hold back their troops.

Westermann assembled his hussars and pursued the Vendéens. Those who were slow and fell behind were massacred, but the larger part of the Vendéen army, reduced to half on its strength, managed to reach Laval on 14 December. The Republican cavalry, not daring to enter the faubourgs, decided to head back.

According to the Committee of Public Safety, 2,000 to 5,000 Vendéens, both combatants and non-combatants, died in Le Mans, while Republican losses totaled only 30 dead and approximately 100 wounded.

Adding to the Vendéen victims of the battle those killed south of Le Mans during the flight to Laval, the total deaths were approximately 15,000.
