= Battle of Laval =

French Revolutionary battle of October 1793

Coordinates: 48.0728°N 0.7700°W

- Part of the War in the Vendée (Virée de Galerne)
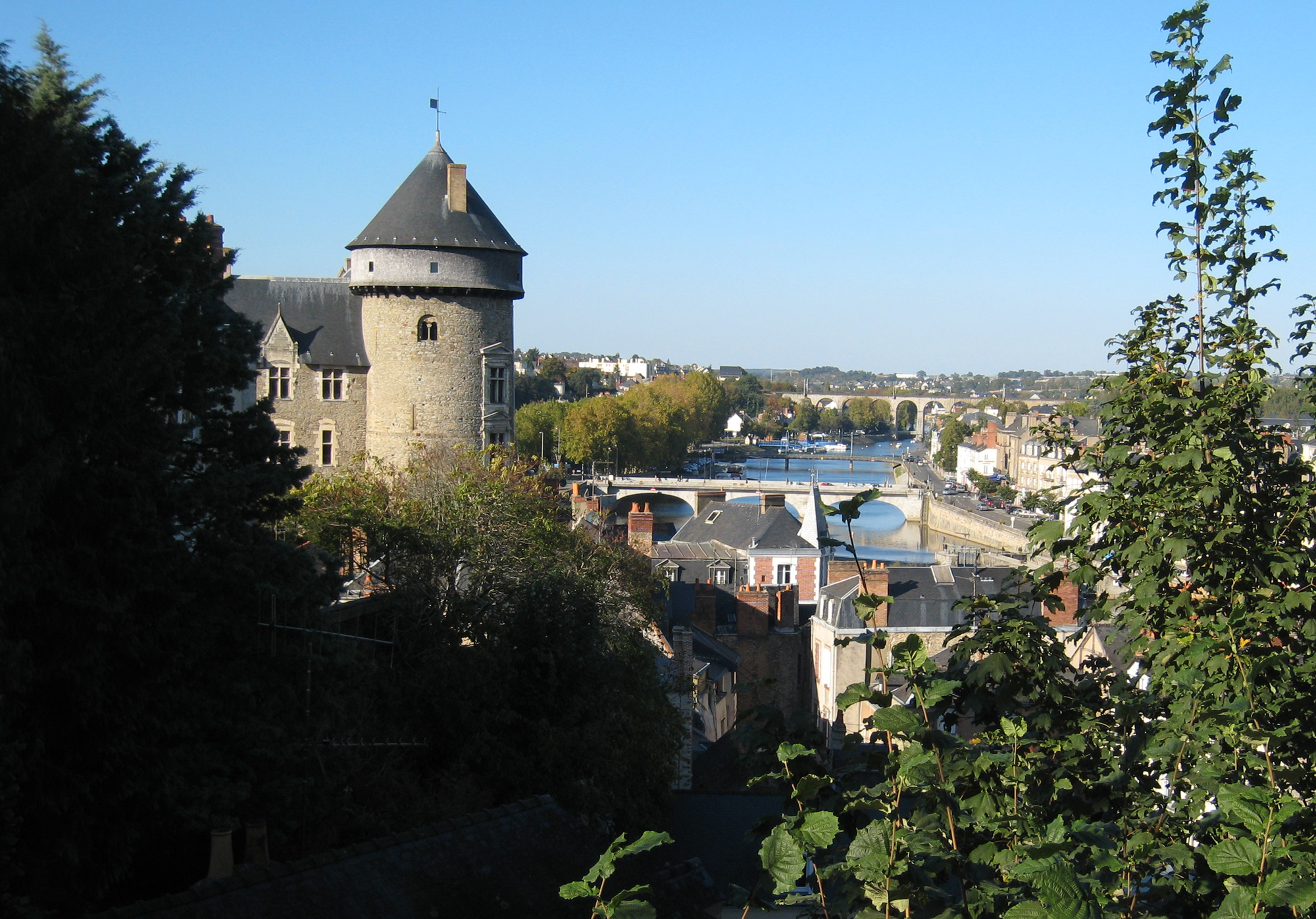
- Château de Laval
| Date | 22 October 1793 |
| Location | Laval |
| Result | Vendéen victory |

Belligerents
| (France) French First Republic | (Kingdom of France) Vendéens |

Commanders and leaders
| François-Joseph Letourneur | Henri de La Rochejacquelein |

Strength
| 6,000 men | 25,000 men |

The battle of Laval took place on 22 October 1793, during the war in the Vendée and saw Vendéen victory over republican troops. This is the first major battle of a particular episode of the war called the Virée de Galerne.

== Prelude ==
After having passed to the other side of the Loire following the disaster at Cholet, the Vendéens had stationed in Varages, where a war counsel was held on 19 October. General Maurice d'Elbée was wounded and absent, so he needed to be replaced, and the officers offered to promote Louis Marie de Lescure to chief general. He declined saying his own wound was too serious, and offered that Henri de La Rochejacquelein were named chief general instead. He finally accepted becoming chief general of the Vendéens at age 21.

The objective of the counsel was to start an uprising in Brittany and Maine, which were in majority favorable to the royalists. To keep contact with Charette and his army, Lescure offered to march to Nantes where the republic defenses were strongly reduced. Talmont, who owned much land in Maine, offered to take Laval where he said his influence in the region was strong enough to start an uprising of a few tens of thousands of men. La Rochejaquelein agreed with this plan.

== The battle ==
On 20 October, the army marched to Laval. On its way it easily defeated the small detachments of Ingrandes and Candé, and later those of Segré and Château-Gontier on 21 October. On 22 October, the Vendéens reached Laval, defended by 6,000 men. Yet the republicans didn't offer a strong defense. After the first Vendéen assault, the general Letourneur ordered the retreat which was chaotic, the troops dispersing in the countryside. All these easily obtained victories reboosted Vendéen moral, and the population of Laval had greeted them well, offering supplies and provisions. The Vendéen generals chose to stay a few days in Laval to wait for reinforcements and let the troops rest.

During that time the Army of the West had crossed the Loire at Angers and Nantes on 22 October, leaving Nicolas Haxo to fight Charette.

== Sources ==
- Yves Gras, La Guerre de Vendée, éditions Economica, 1994, pp. 96–99.
- Jean Tabeur, Paris contre la Province, les guerres de l'Ouest, éditions Economica, 2008, pp. 155–157.
