= Siege of Breda =

Siege of Breda or Capture of Breda may refer to:

- Siege of Breda (1577) by States-General troops
- Capture of Breda (1581) by Claude de Berlaymont, lord of Castle Haultepenne (no real siege, but an urban fight, also known as "The Haultepenne Fury")
- Capture of Breda (1590) by Maurice of Orange (no real siege, but an urban fight)
- Siege of Breda (1624) by Ambrogio Spinola (painted by Velázquez in The Surrender of Breda)
- Siege of Breda (1637) by Frederick Henry, Prince of Orange
- Siege of Breda (1793) by François Joseph Westermann during the War of the First Coalition
- Siege of Breda (1813) by François Roguet and Charles Lefebvre-Desnouettes
