= Michel de Beaupuy =

French soldier (1755–1796)

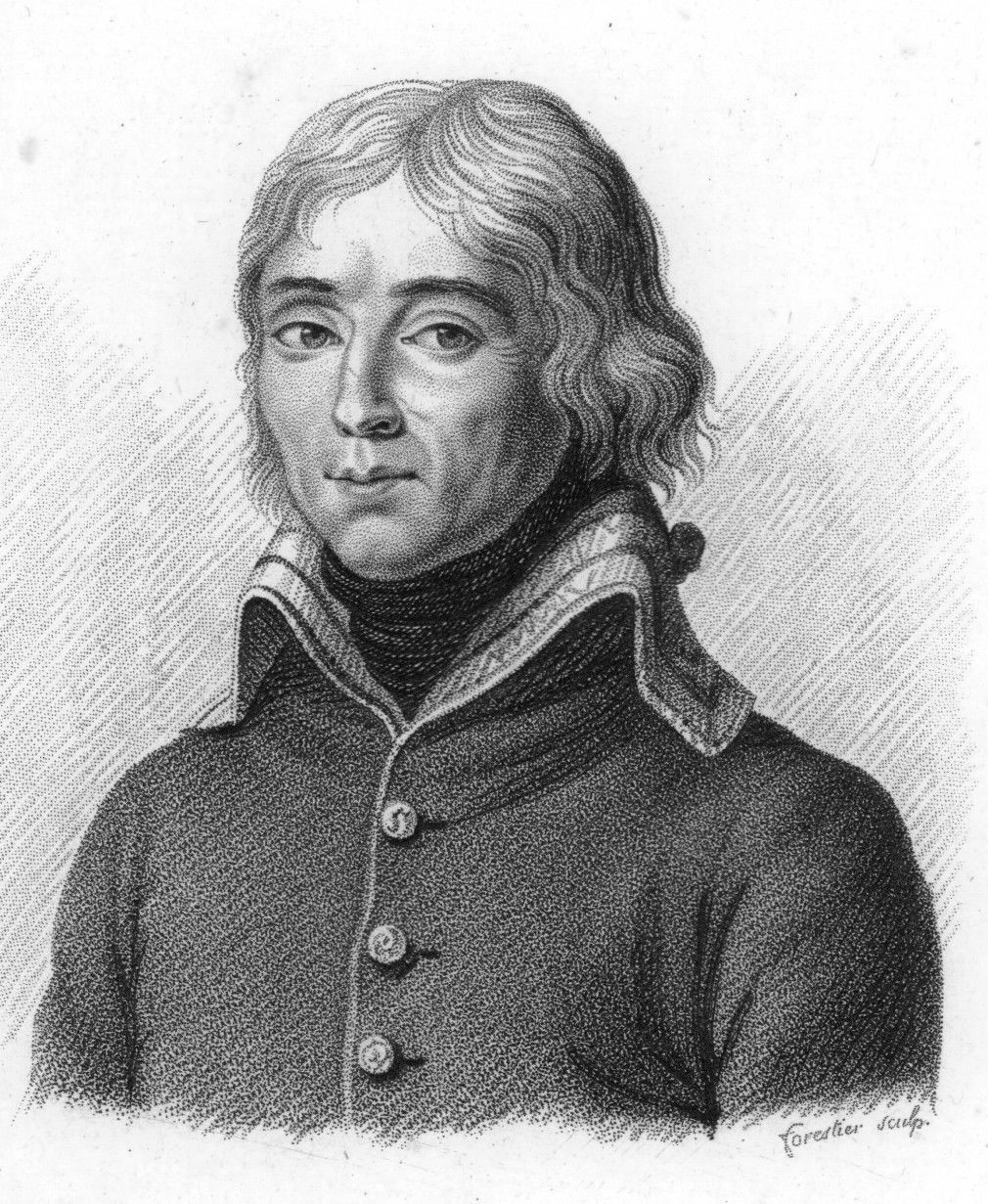
- Born: Armand-Michel Bacharetie de Beaupuy; 14 July 1755; Mussidan
- Died: 19 October 1796 (aged 41); Emmendingen (Volgelsheim)
- Military career
- Allegiance: Kingdom of France; Kingdom of France; French First Republic
- Service years: 1776–1796
- Rank: General of Division
- Conflicts: Siege of Mainz; War in the Vendée; Battle of Clisson; Battle of La Tremblaye; Second Battle of Cholet; Battle of Croix-Bataille; Battle of Entrames; Siege of Angers; Battle of Savenay; War of the First Coalition; Battle of Ettlingen; Battle of Neresheim; Battle of Friedberg; Battle of Biberach; Battle of Emmendingen †

Armand-Michel Bacharetie de Beaupuy (French pronunciation: [aʁmɑ̃ miʃɛl baʃaʁti də bopɥi]; 14 July 1755 – 19 October 1796) was a French soldier. He rose in rank to command an infantry division during the Wars of the French Revolution. He was killed at the Battle of Emmendingen. His surname is one of the names inscribed under the Arc de Triomphe, on Column 18.

== Life ==
=== Republican of noble blood ===
Michel Beaupuy was born in 1755 in a noble family of the Périgord. At age 16 he enlisted as a simple soldier in the King's army, and two years later he became second lieutenant in the regiment of Bassigny.

=== Republican soldier ===
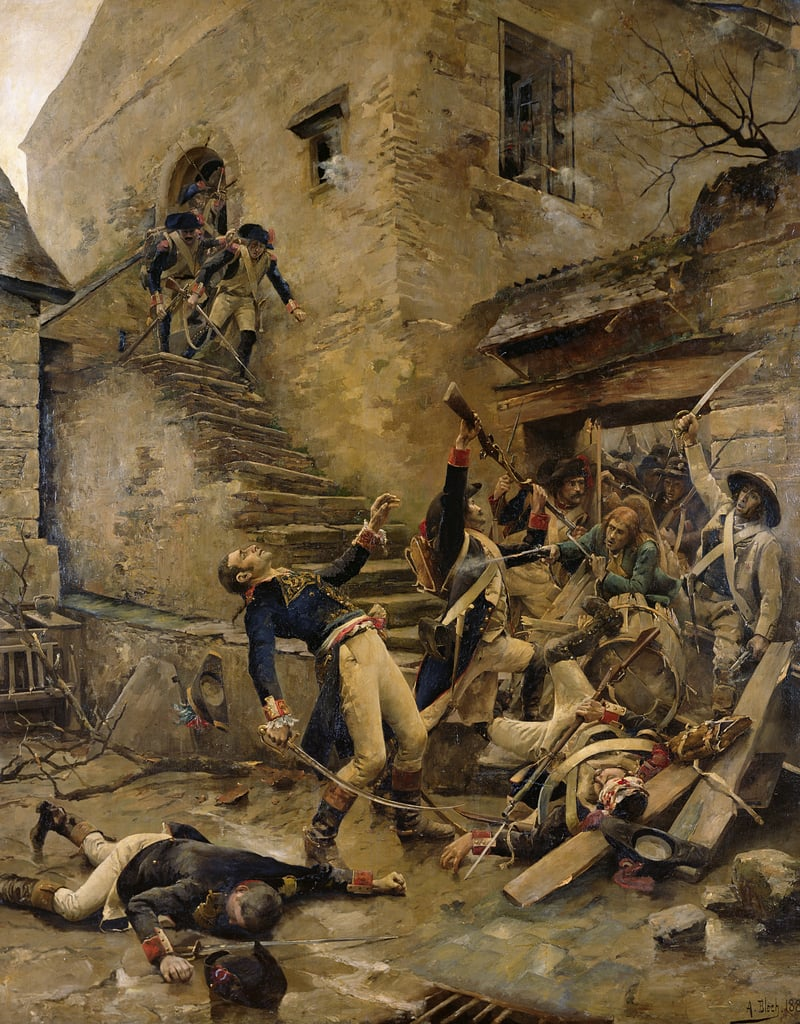
Wounding of General Beaupuy at Château-Gontier (by Alexandre Bloch, 1888)

In 1792, as a commander of a battalion of volunteers from Dordogne, he was noticed and named brigade General in 1793. He participated in the siege of Mainz, then was sent to Vendée with the army of Mainz. He was victorious at the battle of La Tremblaye.

He participated in the Virée de Galerne during the War in the Vendée and was wounded a first time at Château-Gontier and a second time during the Siege of Angers.

In 1794 he was transferred to the army of the Rhine to fight in Germany, and was noticed at Gorick and Forsheim. He commanded the rear guard during the retreat of General Moreau through the Black Forest from Freiburg im Breisgau. It is there that he was killed by a cannonball during the Battle of Emmendingen, in Val d'Enfer.

== Honors ==
=== Monument in Volgelsheim ===
Construction of the monument in Volgelsheim began in 1801. At the end of the 1850s, the monument was unfinished and covered in vegetation. Colonel Ferru had it restored and completed after his arrival in the area at the head of the 63rd infantry regiment in 1861. The expenses were covered by soldiers of the regiment and the towns of Neuf-Brisach and Mussidan. The monument was destroyed by the Germans in 1940, and inaugurated in its current form in 1979.

=== Engraved name ===
- Name engraved on the Arc de Triomphe
- Name engraved at Versailles

== Sources ==
- Jacques de Feytaud, Études sur le sang royal. Les De Brégeas, monographie imprimée, BnF, p. 95–96.
- Paul Huot, Des Vosges au Rhin, excursions et causeries alsaciennes, Veuve Berger-Levrault & Fils, Paris, 1868, p. 284–287.
