= Marie Pierre Adrien Francastel =

French politician (1761–1831)

Marie Pierre Adrien Francastel (1761–1831) was a French politician. During the French Revolution, he was elected to the National Convention from Eure department, and joined the Mountain. Francastel took part, on the Republican side, in the War in the Vendée, including during the Siege of Angers.

== Bibliography ==
- « Marie Pierre Adrien Francastel », dans Adolphe Robert et Gaston Cougny, Dictionnaire des parlementaires français, Edgar Bourloton, 1889–1891
- Jules Michelet, Histoire de la Révolution française
- Camille Bourcier, E. Barassé ed., Essai sur la Terreur en Anjou, 1870
- Mémoires de la Société Nationale d'Agriculture, Sciences et Arts d'Angers, 1914
