= Gaspard de Bernard de Marigny =

French general (1754–1794)

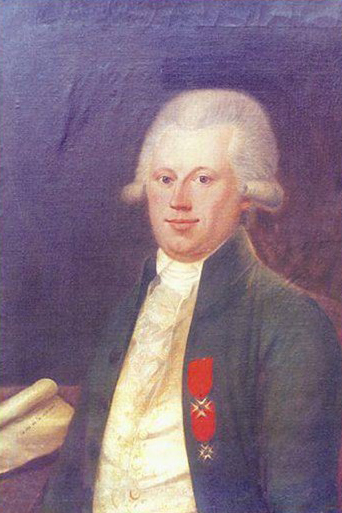
- Born: 2 November 1754; Luçon, France
- Died: 10 July 1794 (aged 39); Combrand, France
- Military career
- Allegiance: Kingdom of France; Véndéens
- Branch: La Royale, then the artillery
- Service years: 1770–1794
- Rank: General
- Conflicts: War in the Vendée; Battle of Thouars; Battle of Saumur; Virée de Galerne
- Awards: Order of Saint Louis

Gaspard Augustin René Bernard de Marigny (French pronunciation: [ɡaspaʁ oɡystɛ̃ ʁəne bɛʁnaʁ də maʁiɲi]; 2 November 1754 – 10 July 1794) was a French officer and Vendéen general.

== Life ==
Bernard de Marigny was a cousin and friend of Louis Marie de Lescure, whose wife Victoire de Donnissan de La Rochejaquelein wrote the following about him :

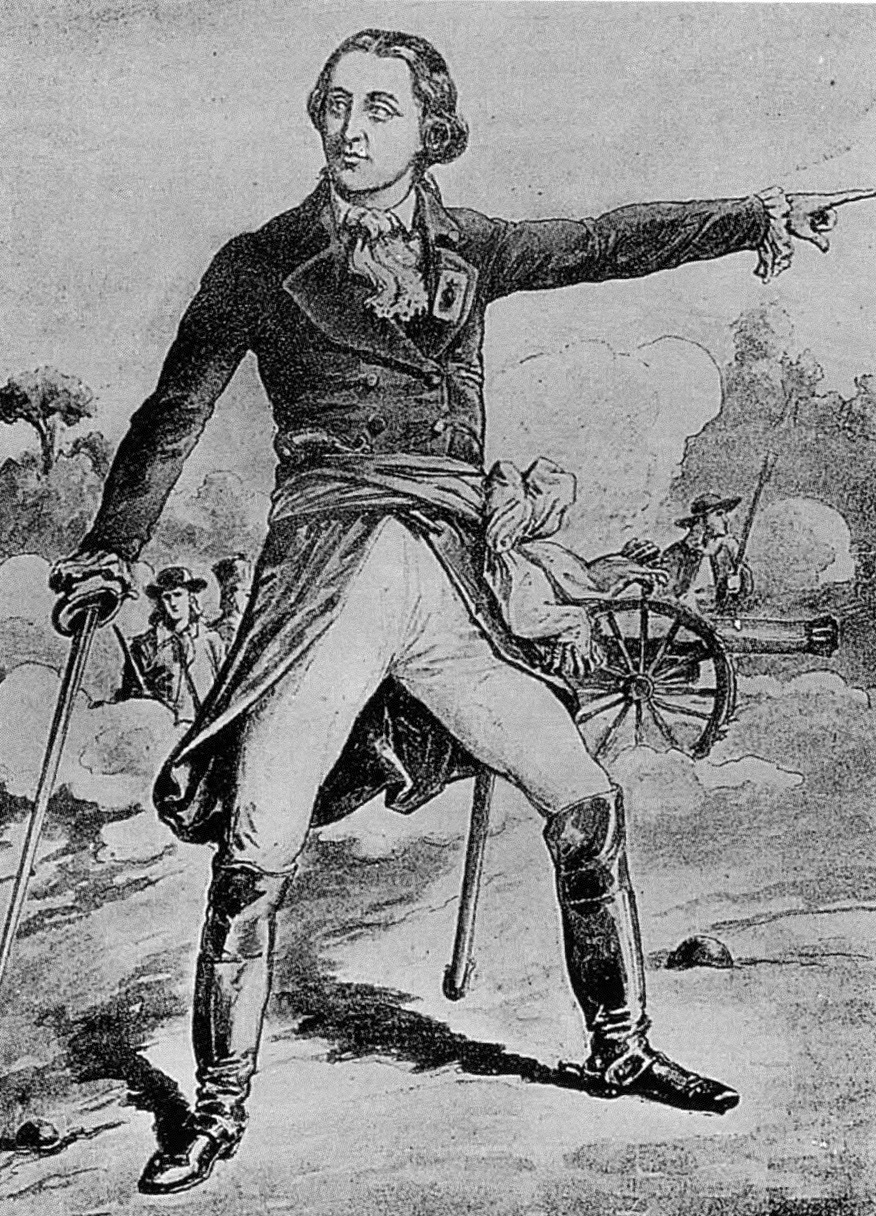
Gaspard de Bernard de Marigny (1754–1794)

"He was a handsome man, of high stature and great physical strength; he was gay, spiritual, loyal and brave. I had never seen someone more obliging : he was always ready to please others; to such an extent that I remember that since he had some knowledge in the veterinary art, all the peasants of the canton came to him when they had sick beasts. He was full of life, and when he became excited, he would be immoderately enthusiastic."

He was a Lieutenant in the French Navy. In 1792, he tried to defend the Tuileries with the king's constitutional guard.

When the war in the Vendée broke out, he was freed by the insurgents at Bressuire, and joined them as commander of their artillery. He distinguished himself at the Battle of Thouars, the Battle of Saumur and during the Virée de Galerne.

He was responsible for the massacre of hundreds of prisoners in the First Battle of Châtillon. He was later proven guilty of other similar exactions against republican prisoners, including some he killed with his own hands. Victoire de Donnissan de La Rochejaquelein commented: "War denatures character. Mr. de Marigny, one of the gentlest and best men I had known, had become bloodthirsty".

In April 1794, he signed an alliance with Charette, Stofflet and Sapinaud. But he didn't get along with Stofflet, who tried to give him a secondary role, so he left. A war counsel was created which condemned Marigny to death on 25 April 1794 by 22 votes, including those of Charette and Stofflet, against 10.

Marigny hence fought alone against the republican troops, but he fell ill and sought refuge in the château de la Girardière, near Combrand. He was arrested by Stofflet's men and executed by firing squad on the spot. The rest of his army deserted or joined Sapinaud who had refused to vote for his execution.

== Sources ==
- Émile Gabory, Les Guerres de Vendée, Robert Laffont, édition de 2009, p. 1436-1437.
- Mémoires de Mme la marquise de La Rochejaquelein
