= First Battle of Châtillon =

Coordinates: 46.9236°N 0.7483°W

- Part of the War in the Vendée
| Date | 5 July 1793 |
| Location | Châtillon |
| Result | Vendéen victory |

Belligerents
| (France) French Republic | (Kingdom of France) Vendéens |

Commanders and leaders
| (France) François-Joseph Westermann | (Kingdom of France) Henri du Vergier (Kingdom of France) Jean-Nicolas Stofflet (Kingdom of France) Louis de Lescure (Kingdom of France) Charles Bonchamps (Kingdom of France) Gaspard de Marigny |

Units involved
| (France) Army of the Coasts of La Rochelle | (Kingdom of France) Catholic and Royal Army |

Strength
| 6,500 men 8 cannons | 25,000 men |

Casualties and losses
| 5,000 killed, wounded or captured | 2,000 killed or wounded |

The First Battle of Châtillon (5 July 1793) during the War in the Vendée saw the Vendean Royalists defeat a French Republican raiding force led by François-Joseph Westermann. The rebel Catholic and Royal Army virtually destroyed the Republican column, only Westermann and a few hundred cavalrymen escaped the disaster. The Vendée revolt was a bitter civil war waged between those who supported the French Revolution and rural farmers who resented the new government's anti-Catholic laws and conscription decrees.

== Background ==
General Westermann had managed to reach the heart of the Vendée capturing Châtillon. Most of the Royalist army had been pushed back during the Battle of Nantes, and their leading general Jacques Cathelineau was severely wounded. Nonetheless, determined to confront the Republican raiders, the leaders of the Vendéen troops, Charles de Bonchamps, Nicolas Stofflet and Gaspard de Bernard de Marigny regrouped their forces at Cholet. The Royalist army, would later through several battles and different wars get to be known for their use of white uniforms. Signaling their loyalty to the Bourbon House, and crown. Prior to advancing into Châtillon for battle the next morning, the Royalist army further increased its strength by joining with the Royalist armies of Henri de La Rochejaquelein and Louis Marie de Lescure.

== Battle ==
At 10 in the morning, the cannon of Marie-Jeanne gave the signal of the attack. After having approached silently, a first column of Vendéens led by Bonchamps, Lescure and La Rochejaquelein attacked the republicans on the Western plateau of Château-Gaillard. Taken by surprise and frightened by the shouts and the number of their enemies, the republicans fled and ran in disorder down the steep plateau. While pulling back to Châtillon, they fell on the second column of Vendéens, led by Stofflet and Marigny, and soon the battle spread into the town. The general Westerman didn't have time to organize his troops, he took his horse and joined the cavalry, fleeing towards Bressuire.

Some republican soldiers gave themselves up but the fires they had started pushed the Vendéens' will for vengeance and some were massacred. Some officers, like Marigny who killed a few prisoners with his own hands, even encouraged the massacres. Others like Lescure tried to stop them and approximately 1,000 prisoners were saved.

== Aftermath ==
Among the over 6,000 men, 2,000 republican soldiers were killed in combat or massacred, 3,000 others were made prisoners, and the entire artillery was lost. Only Westermann and 500 cavalry men had managed to escape, but they were attacked by Vendéens in their way home to Parthenay, where he only brought back 300 men.

The expedition of Westermann had started well but finished in disaster. Westermann was called to Paris by the National Convention, who sent him to Niort where he was trialed in front of the war counsel. He was acquitted, only barely escaping the guillotine.

== Sources ==
- Bodart, Gaston (1908). Militär-historisches Kriegs-Lexikon (1618–1905) [Military-Historical War Lexicon (1618–1905)] (in German). C. W. Stern.
