= Siege of Breda (1793) =

Siege of the War of the First Coalition

- Part of the Flanders Campaign in the War of the First Coalition
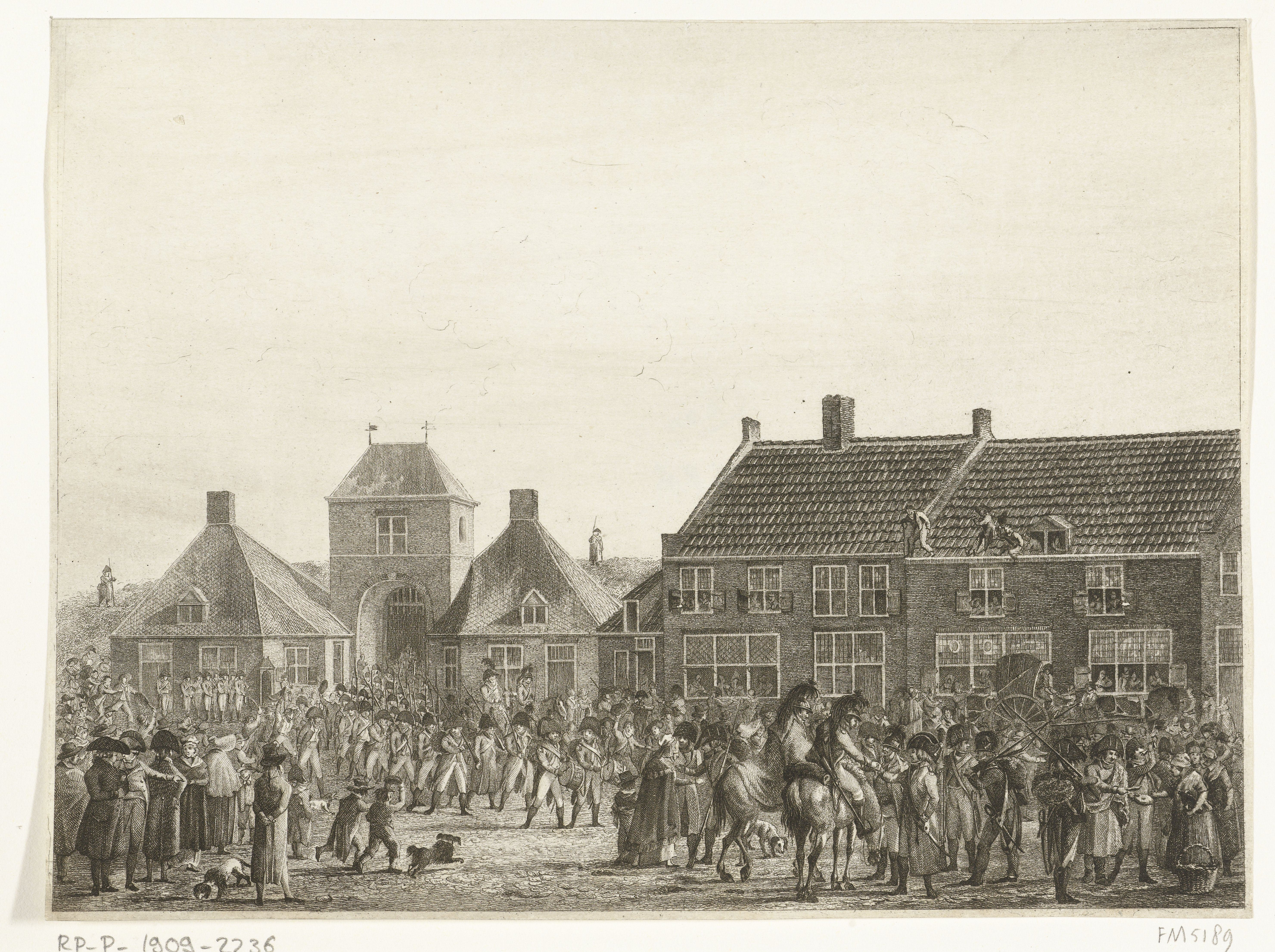
- French soldiers move into Breda after its capitulation.
Date	21 – 27 February 1793
Location	Breda, Dutch Republic 51°35′00″N 4°47′00″E
Result	French victory

Belligerents
(French First Republic) France: Armée du Nord; Batavian Legion	Dutch Republic: Dutch States Army

Commanders and leaders
François Joseph Westermann	Alexander van Bylandt

Strength
3,800 troops 4 mortars 4 howitzers	1,335 infantrymen 197 dragoons 153 artillerists
- Location within Netherlands Siege of Breda (1793) (North Sea)

The siege of Breda took place from 21 to 27 February 1793 in the course of the Flanders Campaign during the War of the First Coalition.

== Background ==
After the French Revolutionary Armée du Nord commanded by general Charles-François Dumouriez unexpectedly inflicted a devastating defeat on the Austrians at the Battle of Jemappes (6 November 1792), it was able to occupy the Austrian Netherlands almost without any further resistance and attempt an invasion of the weakened Dutch Republic. Dumouriez was assisted by the Batavian Legion of the Patriot leaders Herman Willem Daendels and Jan Willem de Winter. Breda was an important fortress in Staats-Brabant; moreover, the Barony of Breda was a centuries-old personal possession of the House of Orange-Nassau, and thus had a symbolic significance for the radical republicans in Paris. On 10 February 1793, when the Franco–Batavian forces were closing in, stadtholder William V, Prince of Orange ordered commander Alexander van Bylandt to defend Breda at all costs:

Ne vous embarrassez pas si mon chateau et tout ce qui je possède dans la baronnie est brulé ou détruit, je dois à mon pays mon sang pour sa défense s'il le faut, je lui dois aussi la sacrifice de mes biens quand il s'agit de la conservation de ma patrie.
(Don't be embarrassed if my castle and everything I possess in the barony is burnt down or destroyed; I owe to my country my blood for its defence if it's necessary, I also owe it the sacrifice of my properties when the preservation of my fatherland is at stake.)

== Siege ==
The Armée du Nord crossed the border on 16 February, and already began planting liberty trees in villages near Breda two days later. A first skirmish took place on 21 February, after which the French, with 3,800 men under the command of François Joseph Westermann, closed all access roads to the city and started constructing the siege works. On 23 February, the artillery batteries were in place and the beleaguers began to bombard Breda with four mortars and four howitzers. During a ceasefire, Colonel Philippe Devaux de Vautray ordered the city to surrender, but this demand was rejected, leading the attackers to resume the bombardment. The next morning, between 3 and 6 o'clock, the French fired the last of their ammunition, although the defenders did not know this. 90 bombs and 100 grenades had been launched over the walls, destroying approximately 60 houses and three times causing fires that were soon extinguished. There were only few casualties on either side. However, when colonel Devaux again demanded the city to surrender in the early morning of 24 February, using threatening words, it was accepted under the condition that the Dutch States Army garrison would be granted a withdrawal with full military honours. The next day, the French occupied the gate to 's-Hertogenbosch (Bossche Poort), and on 27 February they entered the city while the States soldiers marched out. Quint Ondaatje was present, when it was occupied by an army of Sans-Culottes that lacked almost everything.

Within a few days the Armée du Nord was ordered to return to Brussels rather than further entering Holland.

== Aftermath ==
The next day Dumouriez himself arrived in Breda. A liberty tree with a Phrygian cap on top was planted in front of the town hall, and Dumouriez and his officers danced around it whilst singing "La Marseillaise". A gallows was later placed next to it, to maintain order. A Batavian Committee was appointed to form a new governance. However, when Dumouriez suffered a crushing defeat in the Battle of Neerwinden (18 March 1793), commander Flers prepared the city's defences. On 29 March, a States officer ordered the fortress to capitulate in the name of the Prince of Orange, while Dumouriez sent Flers a letter ordering him to evacuate Breda. After several days of negotiations, the French handed the city back to the States without firing a single shot.

In September 1794, the French returned and there were several skirmishes in the environs of Breda, leading people to fear a new siege. This would not happen, however: the French besieged 's-Hertogenbosch, Grave and Nijmegen, crossed the frozen rivers, advanced through the Bommelerwaard and occupied Utrecht and Amsterdam in January 1795. While the stadtholder and his family and entourage fled to England, the Batavian Revolution in Amsterdam occurred and the Batavian Republic was proclaimed on 18 January. This rendered further resistance futile, and Breda surrendered without a fight on 27 January 1795.

== Literature ==
- G. G. van der Hoeven (1868) Geschiedenis der vesting Breda, p. 216–228. Breda: Broese & Comp.
