= Siege of Angers =

1793 siege

Coordinates: 47.4736°N 0.5542°W

- Part of the War in the Vendée
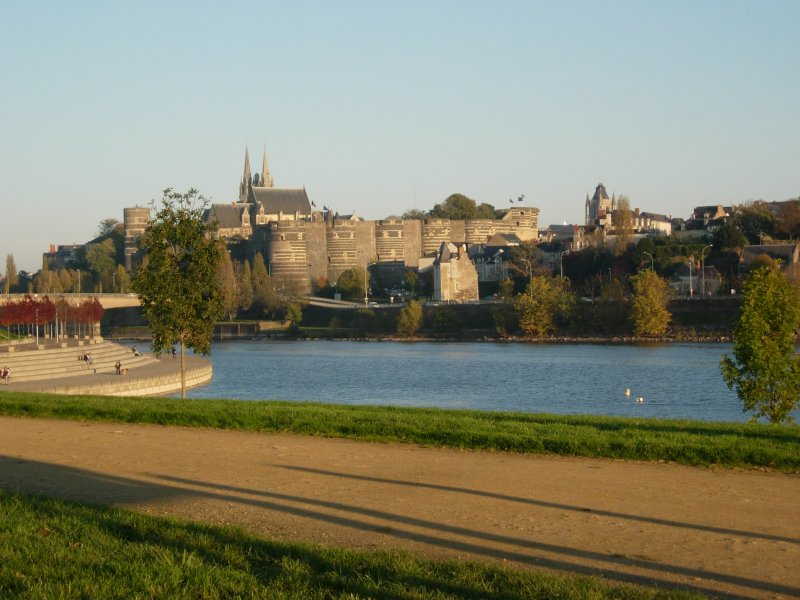
- Angers Castle
Date	3–4 December 1793
Location	Angers
Result	Republican victory

Belligerents
(France) French Republic	' (Kingdom of France) French Royalists

Commanders and leaders
• Louis Thévenet • Jean-Pierre Boucret • Michel de Beaupuy • Jean Bouin de Marigny	• Henri de La Rochejaquelein • Jean-Nicolas Stofflet

Strength
4,000 men	15,000 to 20,000 men

Casualties and losses
400 killed or wounded	800 killed, 1,200 wounded

The siege of Angers was a siege of the French town of Angers on 3 December 1793 in the War in the Vendée. Among the combatants was Françoise Després, a loyal monarchist and Catholic who disguised herself as a man to serve in the Bourbon army.

== Background ==
Pushed back at Granville, the Vendéens hoped to reach the south of the Loire to which the path was open thanks to their victory in the Battle of Dol. On 23 November, the Vendéen generals met at Antrain. The chief general Henri de La Rochejaquelein offered to march to Rennes where the republican army had sought refuge, in order to finish it off and free Brittany, the army could then attack Nantes to return to Vendée while meeting with Charette's army. On the other hand, Stofflet wanted to return by the shortest road, thus attacking Angers. Finally, Antoine-Philippe de La Trémoille wanted to attack Granville again, the town's garrison was reduced and the English seemed more willing to intervene there. This last plan was chosen by the officers, but the Vendéen soldiers refused to obey and rather followed Stofflet's plan. The generals were forced to follow.

The army thus marched to Angers. The Vendéens were no longer worried about the republican troops too busy reorganizing their forces, but they were ravaged by illnesses (dysentery, typhus and cholera) related to famine caused by their difficulties in supply and in protecting themselves from the cold of the upcoming winter.

== The battle ==
Angers was defended by 4,000 republican soldiers commanded by generals Louis Michel Auguste Thévenet and Jean-Pierre Boucret. The general Michel de Beaupuy, who was still recovering from wounds of the Battle of Entrames, was also present and wished to participate in the battle nonetheless.

On 3 December the Vendéens attacked, but the initial assault wasn't better planned than at Granville, they spread into the faubourgs abandoned by the republicans but without siege weapons they were unable to pass the fortifications.

All day long, the Vendéen artillery of Gaspard de Bernard de Marigny bombarded the town gates with very limited success.

On 4 December, the Vendéen tried another attack, on the verge of taking the Cupif gate the republican troops led by general Jean Fortuné Boüin de Marigny arrived as reinforcements. These troops were the avant-garde of the Army of the West, their arrival provoked panic in Vendéen lines who abandoned the siege and fled back to the North-East, towards Le Mans.

Although victorious, the general Boüin de Marigny was killed at the end of the battle, hit by a cannon ball.

After the battle, following the orders of Marie Pierre Adrien Francastel, the severed heads of the Vendéens and Chouans killed during the fighting were exposed on the fortifications.

Pitre-Chevalier also wrote that the sans-culottes, following orders of Levasseur "made a lustral procession, and burnt the frankincense of the fatherland to purify the walls from royalist contact".

== See also ==
- Virée de Galerne
