= Étienne-Alexandre Bernier =

French religious figure and Royalist politician (1762-1806)

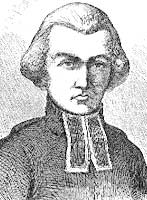
Étienne-Alexandre Bernier

Étienne-Alexandre Bernier or Abbé Bernier (French pronunciation: [etjɛn alɛksɑ̃dʁ bɛʁnje]; 31 October 1762 – 1 October 1806) was a French religious figure and Royalist politician during the French Revolution.

Born in Daon, Mayenne, Bernier was a professor of theology at the University of Angers and a vicar in the city of Angers. He refused to take the Civil Oath demanded by the Revolution, and, in 1793, joined the Revolt in the Vendée, and, for a while, was its leader alongside Jean-Nicolas Stofflet. He negotiated the peace with French Revolutionary Army General Lazare Hoche, and worked to have the Vendée pacified.

Under Napoleon Bonaparte, Bernier was assigned to negotiate the unification of nation and church in France with the Papal delegation of Pius VII. After successful completion of the 1801 Concordat, he was named Bishop of Orléans by Napoleon in 1802.

He died in Paris.
