= Battle of Granville =

Coordinates: 48.8381°N 1.5869°W

- Part of the War in the Vendée
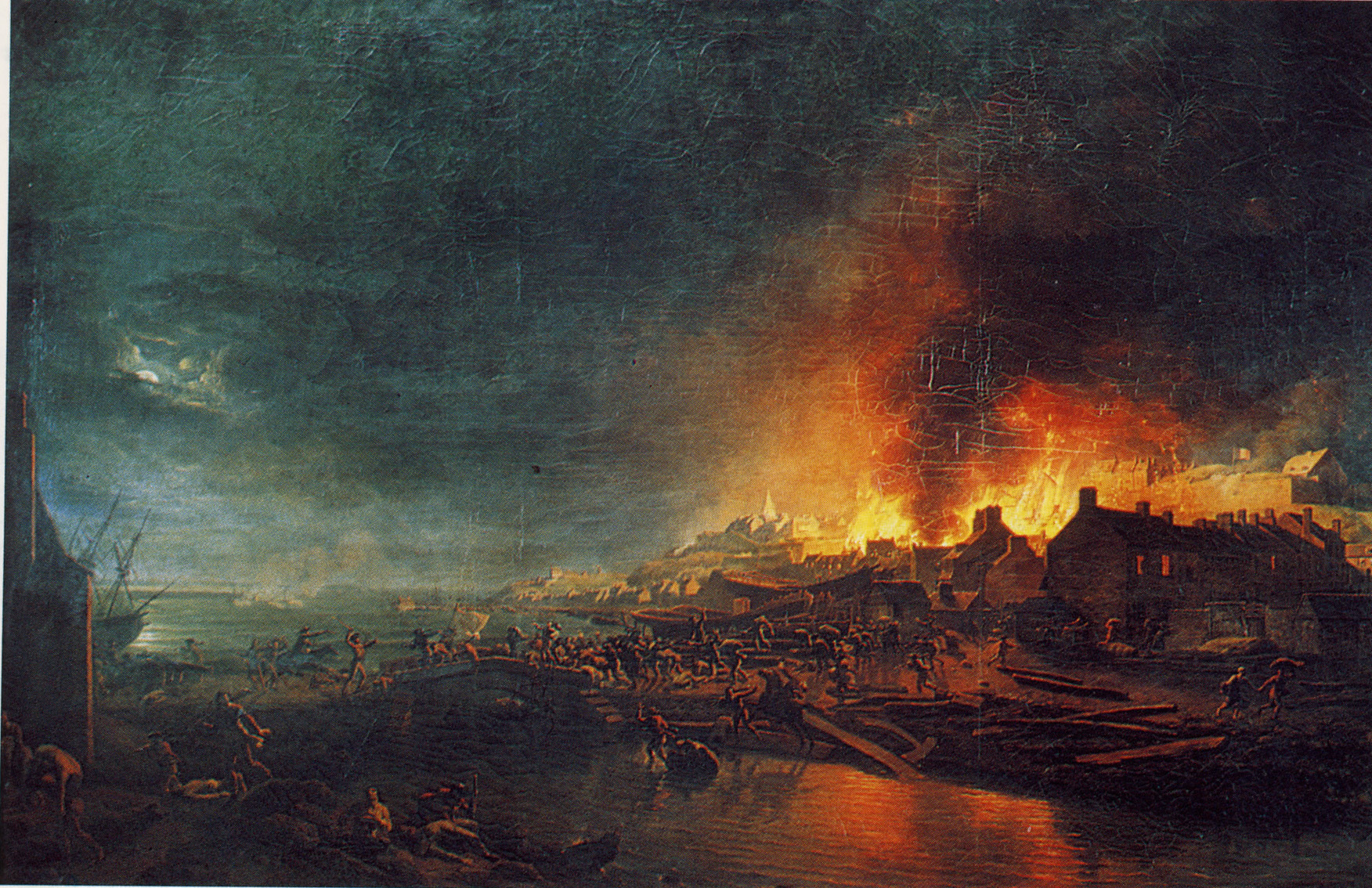
- The burning of Granville by the Vendéens, painting by Jean-François Hue
Date	14 November 1793
Location	Granville, Manche, France
Result	Republican victory

Belligerents
(France) Republicans	(Kingdom of France) Vendéens (Kingdom of France) Chouans

Commanders and leaders
André Pacifique Peyre; François Vachot	Henri de La Rochejaquelein

Strength
5,500 men	25,000 men

Casualties and losses
Unknown	600 dead 1,400 wounded

The siege of Granville occurred at Granville, Manche on 14 November 1793. It faced 5,000 Republicans besieged by Vendéen forces during the Virée de Galerne. The battle ended with a Republican victory.

== Battle ==
A rumour ran through the Vendéen ranks that if they reached a port the British would come to their aid. Their first choice was the port at Saint-Malo but they finally fixed on Granville, apparently less well-defended. On 14 November the Vendéens arrived before the city, but they had no siege equipment and there were no British forces in sight. Even so, the Vendéens launched an assault and took the suburbs, but their advance was hampered when a fire broke out and burned down the suburbs. The Vendéens thus passed by the grêve and began to climb the rocks at the foot of the ramparts, when cries of "Treason!" began to spread through their ranks, probably shouted by Republican spies. Quickly panic overtook the Vendéens and, as many fled, the assault failed. Having heard no news of the British forces (despite their actually being very nearby, at Jersey), La Rochejaquelein decided to raise the siege.

== Aftermath ==
This victory was decisive for the Republicans, who thus avoided the Vendéens and Chouans linking up with the British. Discouraged, the Vendéens made an about-turn in an attempt to cross the river Loire again, and managed to fight several more battles in the campaign.
