= Jean-Nicolas Stofflet =

French military leader (1753–1796)

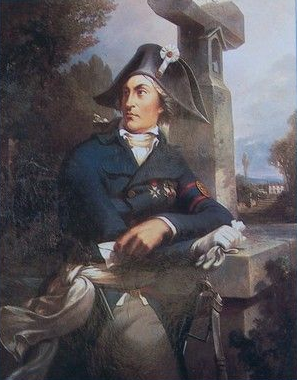
- 19th-century portrait of Stofflet
- Born: 3 February 1753; Bathelémont-lès-Bauzemont, Kingdom of France
- Died: 25 February 1796 (aged 43); Angers, French First Republic
- Military career
- Allegiance: Kingdom of France; Royalist rebels
- Branch: Swiss Guards
- Rank: Major General
- Commands: Catholic and Royal Army
- Conflicts: War in the Vendée; Battle of Thouars; Battle of Nantes; Second Battle of Cholet; Virée de Galerne; Battle of Entrames; Battle of Fougères; Battle of Granville; Battle of Dol; Siege of Angers
- Awards: Order of Saint Louis, Grand Cross

Jean-Nicolas Stofflet (French pronunciation: [ʒɑ̃ nikɔlɑ stɔflɛ]; 3 February 1753 – 25 February 1796) was a French leader of the Revolt in the Vendée against the First French Republic.

Born in Bathelémont-lès-Bauzemont (Meurthe-et-Moselle), the son of a miller, he was for long a private in the Swiss Guard, and afterwards gamekeeper to the comte de Colbert-Maulévrier, he joined the Vendéans when they rose against the Revolution to defend Roman Catholicism and Royalist principles. During the war in Vendée, he served first under Maurice d'Elbée, and fought at Fontenay-le-Comte, Cholet and Saumur, and distinguished himself at the battles of Beaupréau, Laval and Antrain.

He was appointed major-general of the Royalist army, and in 1794 succeeded Henri de la Rochejaquelein as commander-in-chief of the Catholic and Royal Army. Stofflet established his headquarters in the Forest of Vezins. But his quarrels with another Vendéan leader, François de Charette, and the defeats sustained by the Vendéan troops, led him to submit and accept the terms of the Treaty of La Jaunaye with the National Convention (2 May 1795).

He, however, soon violated this treaty, and at the instigation of Royalist agents took arms in December of the same year on behalf of the Count of Provence, from whom he had received the rank of maréchal-de-camp. This last action of Stofflet's failed completely. He was taken prisoner by the Republic, sentenced to death by a military commission, and shot at Angers.
