= François Joseph Westermann =

French Army officer

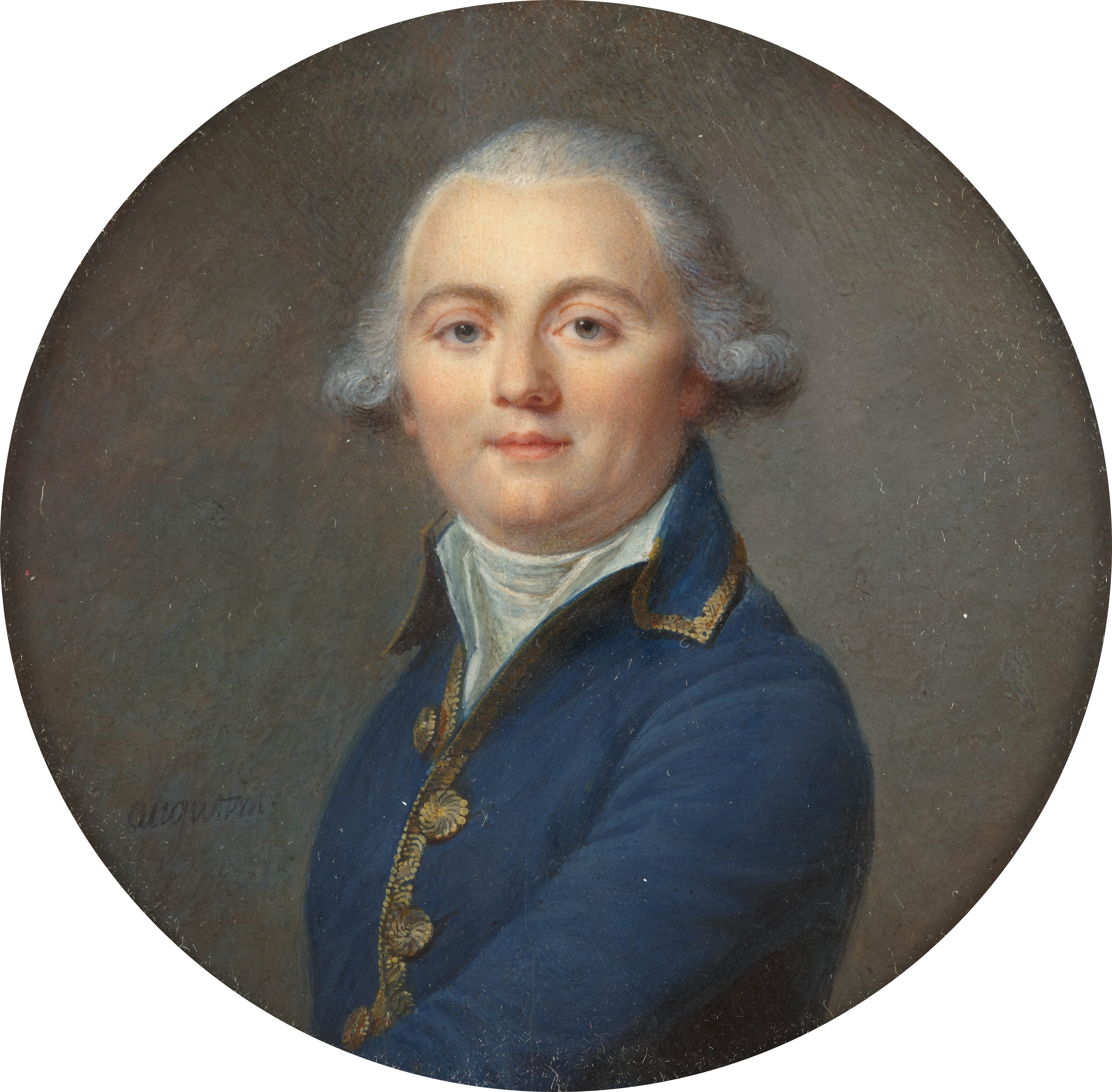
- Portrait by Jean-Baptiste Jacques Augustin, 1793
- Born: 5 September 1751; Molsheim, France
- Died: 5 April 1794 (aged 42) Paris, France
- Allegiance: Kingdom of France; French First Republic
- Branch: French Royal Army; French Revolutionary Army
- Service years: 1767–1773; 1792–1794
- Rank: Brigade general
- Conflicts: Insurrection of 10 August 1792; French Revolutionary Wars; War of the First Coalition; Siege of Breda (1793); War in the Vendée; First Battle of Châtillon; Second Battle of Châtillon; Second Battle of Cholet; Battle of Entrames; Battle of Granville; Battle of Dol; Battle of Le Mans (1793); Battle of Savenay

Brigade-General François Joseph Westermann (5 September 1751 – 5 April 1794) was a French Army officer. He is best known as one of the main French Republican commanders in the initial stage of the War in the Vendée.

== Early life and military career ==
Westermann was born on 5 September 1751 in Molsheim, Alsace (today department of Bas-Rhin). He enlisted in Count Esterhazy's regiment of hussars in 1767, retiring six years later as a non-commissioned officer. In 1788, he was briefly employed at the Count of Artois' stables in Paris, then returned to Alsace to work in the city government of Strasbourg. Westermann was an enthusiastic supporter of the French Revolution, and in 1790 became greffier of the municipality of Haguenau. After a short imprisonment on a charge of inciting riots in Haguenau, Westermann moved to Paris in May 1792, where he became an ally of revolutionary leader Georges Danton.

Westermann played a leading role in the insurrection of 10 August 1792, where he commanded a unit of fédérés in the attack on the Tuileries Palace. Afterwards, Westermann rejoined the army and accompanied General Charles François Dumouriez on his campaigns with the Army of the North and the Army of the Ardennes, and assisted him in his negotiations with the Duke of Brunswick. He served under Dumouriez in the invasion of the Netherlands, most notably at the Siege of Breda (21–27 February 1793), but was arrested as an accomplice after the general's defection in April 1793. Denounced by Jean-Paul Marat to the National Convention, Westermann succeeded in proving his innocence, and was promoted to brigade general and sent to quell the Revolt in the Vendée.

== War in the Vendée ==
Westermann distinguished himself by his extraordinary courage, daring maneuvers, and severe treatment of the insurgents. Appointed commander of the vanguard of the Army of the Coasts of La Rochelle on 18 May 1793, he defeated the rebels at Parthenay on 20 June, then captured Châtillon on 3 July. After suffering a defeat at the First Battle of Châtillon, Westermann was suspended and brought before the National Convention, only recovering his command on 29 August.

After serving in the Second Battle of Châtillon, Westermann received a command in the Army of the West. Beaten at the battles of Croix-Bataille and Entrames, he defeated the Vendéens at Beaupréau, Granville, and in December 1793 annihilated the Catholic and Royal Army at the Battle of Le Mans and the Battle of Savenay.

In a controversial document, the authenticity of which is disputed, Westermann supposedly wrote to the Committee of Public Safety:

"There is no more Vendée, Republican citizens. It died beneath our free sword, with its women and its children. I have just buried it in the swamps and the woods of Savenay. Following the orders that you gave to me, I crushed the children beneath the horses' hooves, massacred the women who, those at least, will bear no more brigands. I do not have a single prisoner to reproach myself with. I have exterminated them all..."

Some historians believe this letter never existed. The rebellion was still going on, and there were several thousand living Vendéan prisoners being held by Westermann's forces when the letter was supposedly written. The killing of civilians would also have been an explicit violation of the Convention's orders to Westermann.

After his victory, in January 1794 Westermann was summoned to Paris, where, as a friend and partisan of Danton, he was proscribed and sentenced to death by the Revolutionary Tribunal. He was guillotined along with the Dantonist party on 5 April 1794.

He is depicted by Jacques Villeret in the 1983 film Danton and by Eduard von Winterstein in the 1921 movie of the same name.
