= Henri de la Rochejaquelein =

French royalist military officer (1772–1794)

Henri du Vergier de la Rochejaquelein
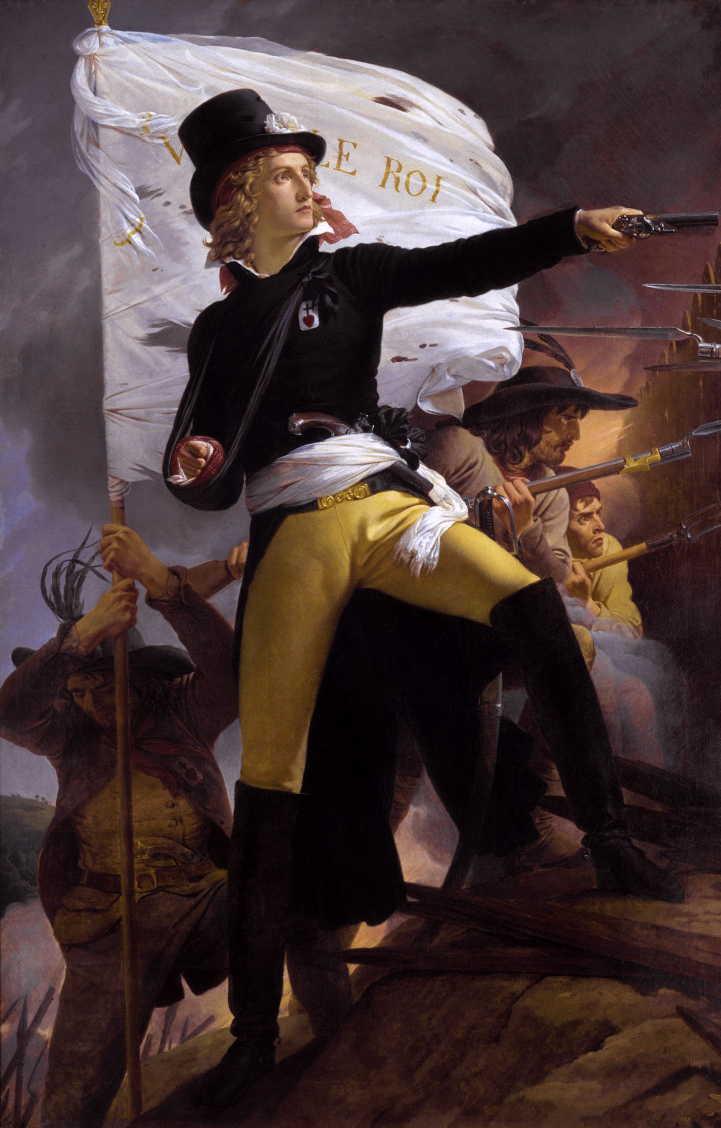
- Portrait of Henri de la Rochejaquelein by Pierre-Narcisse Guérin, c. 1816
- Born: 30 August 1772; Mauléon, Kingdom of France
- Died: 28 January 1794 (aged 21); Nuaillé, French First Republic
- Military career
- Allegiance: Kingdom of France; Royalist rebels
- Branch: French Royal Army
- Service years: 1785–1794
- Rank: Generalissimo
- Commands: Catholic and Royal Army
- Conflicts: Insurrection of 10 August 1792; War in the Vendée; Battle of Aubiers; Battle of Vezins; Battle of Thouars; Battle of La Châtaigneraie; Battle of Doué; First Battle of Châtillon; Battle of Luçon; Battle of Saint-Fulgent; Second Battle of Châtillon; Battle of Croix-Bataille; Second Battle of Cholet; Virée de Galerne; Battle of Laval; Battle of Entrames; Battle of Fougères; Battle of Granville; Battle of Dol; Siege of Angers; Battle of Le Mans

Henri du Vergier, comte de la Rochejaquelein (French pronunciation: [ɑ̃ʁi dy vɛʁʒje kɔ̃t də la ʁɔʃʒaklɛ̃]; 30 August 1772 – 28 January 1794) was the youngest general of the Royalist Vendéan insurrection during the French Revolution. At the age of 21, he served as commander-in-chief of the Catholic and Royal Army.

== Biography ==
=== Early activities ===
Born in the Château de la Durbelière, Saint-Aubin-de-Baubigné, near Châtillon, La Rochejaquelein joined the Royal Polish Regiment, of which his father was colonel, in 1787. In February 1789 he became a member of the Flanders regiment of chasseurs. In March 1792 he became a member of the Constitutional Guard, charged with protecting the King of France. He fought for the first time defending the Tuileries Palace during the 10 August 1792 attack, as an officer of the Constitutional Guard of King Louis XVI.

Returning to his home province, he refused to comply with the levée en masse called by the outbreak of the French Revolutionary Wars and joined his cousin Louis Marie de Lescure on the latter's estates in Poitou.

=== Rebellion ===
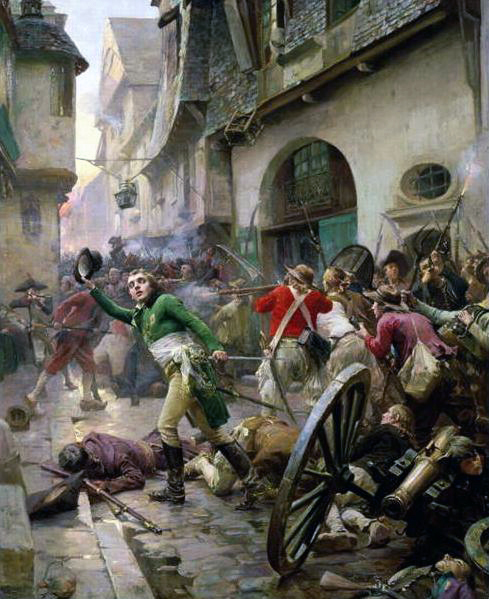
Henri de La Rochejacquelein at the Battle of Cholet in 1793, by Paul-Émile Boutigny,

Resistance to conscription soon escalated into a full rebellion, known as the War in the Vendée. Soon after, de la Rochejaquelein and his compatriots started fighting the troops of the French Republic with Maurice d'Elbée and the Marquis de Bonchamps from April 1793. There, he gave his famous order, "Mes amis, si j'avance, suivez-moi! Si je recule, tuez-moi! Si je meurs, vengez-moi!" (literal translation: "Friends, if I advance, follow me! If I retreat, kill me! If I die, avenge me!").

Leading a few thousand Vendéan peasants, de la Rochejaquelein gained his first victory over the French Revolutionary Army on 13 April, took part in the taking of Bressuire on 3 May, in the Battle of Fontenay-le-Comte on 25 May and in the Battle of Saumur on 9 June. At Fontenay he was famous for his contempt for danger, wearing three red handkerchiefs; on his head, around his neck and at his waist to defy the Republican gunners. After Fontenay his companions decided that they would also wear three red handkerchiefs so that de la Rochejacquelin could not be singled out.

In August, after the Battle of Luçon, he regrouped the Vendéan army, which was on the verge of being disbanded, and won the Battle of Chantonnay on 5 September. On 13 September the thumb of his right hand was shattered by a bullet during an engagement with Republicans at Martigné-Briand but he continued to fire at his opponents. His famous portrait by Pierre-Narcisse Guérin shows him with his right arm in a sling, shooting with his left hand. He had to retreat across the Loire after being beaten in the Second Battle of Cholet, on 17 October.

=== Final months ===
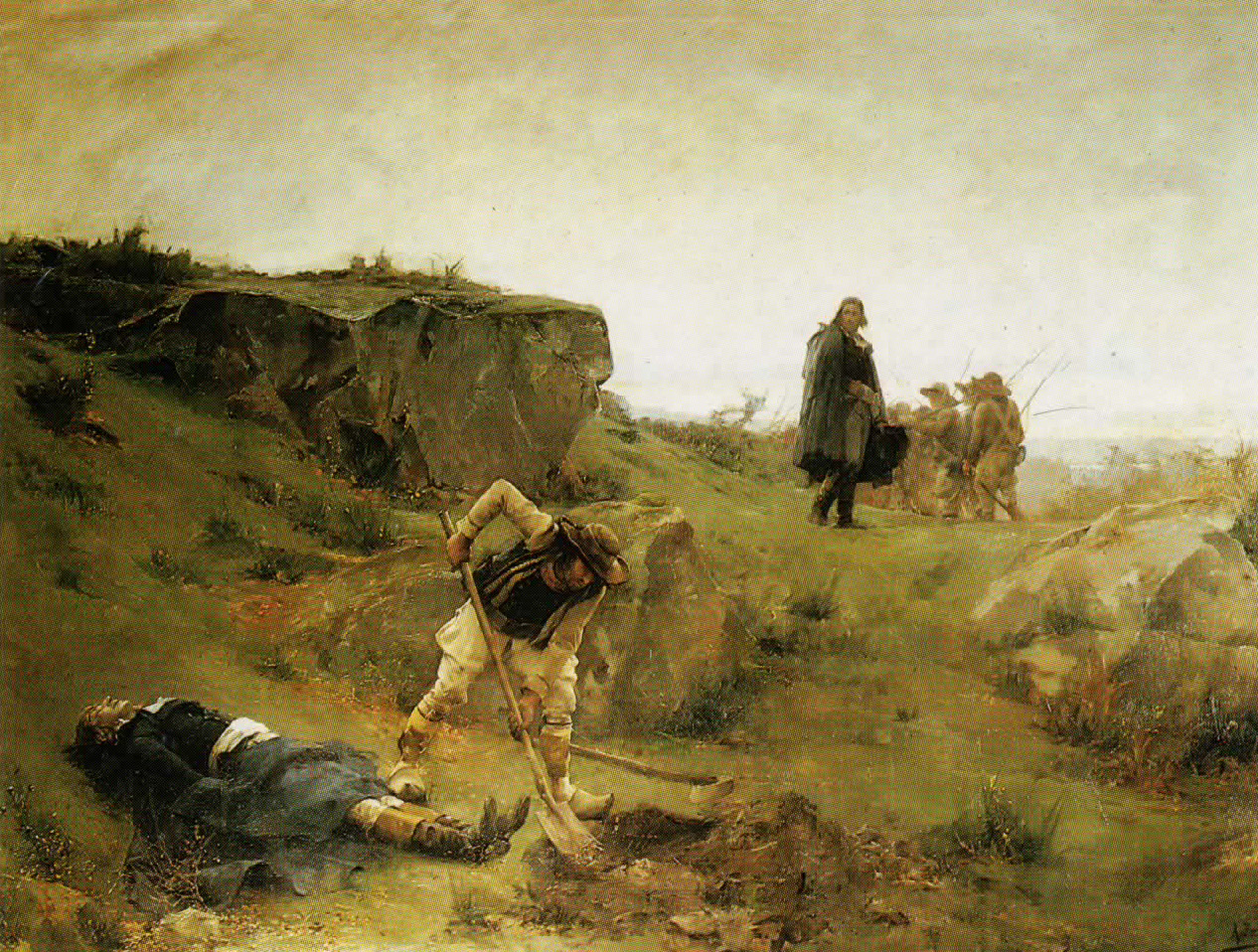
The Death of Henri de La Rochejaquelein, painting by Alexandre Bloch

On 20 October, de la Rochejaquelein was unanimously elected as commander-in-chief of the Catholic and Royal Army, replacing d'Elbée who had been severely wounded in Cholet. However, his bravery did not compensate for his lack of experience and strategic skills. He marched onto Granville, took Avranches on 12 November but failed to seize Granville and retreated to Angers in order to cross the Loire.

Larger forces under François Séverin Marceau, Jean Baptiste Kléber, and François Joseph Westermann gave chase, defeating him once in Le Mans on 12 December and again, more severely, on 23 December in Savenay. After this decisive rout, the Catholic and Royal Army was no longer a fighting force; de la Rochejacquelein had to take to the woods disguised as a peasant. He managed to save the remains of his army by crossing the Loire, and left under the criticism of his fellow companions.

While trying to pursue a guerrilla war against the Republicans, he was killed by a Republican soldier near Nuaillé on 28 January 1794. On a reconnaissance mission he had spotted two Republican soldiers who pretended to surrender to him, but then shot him in the forehead. His brother Louis became the head of the royalists in Vendée in 1813 and furthered the royalist cause there during the Hundred Days period. He fell in battle at Pont-de-Mathis on 4 June 1815.
