= Battle of Entrames =

1793 battle of the War in the Vendée

Coordinates: 47.9967°N 0.7125°W

- Part of the War in the Vendée
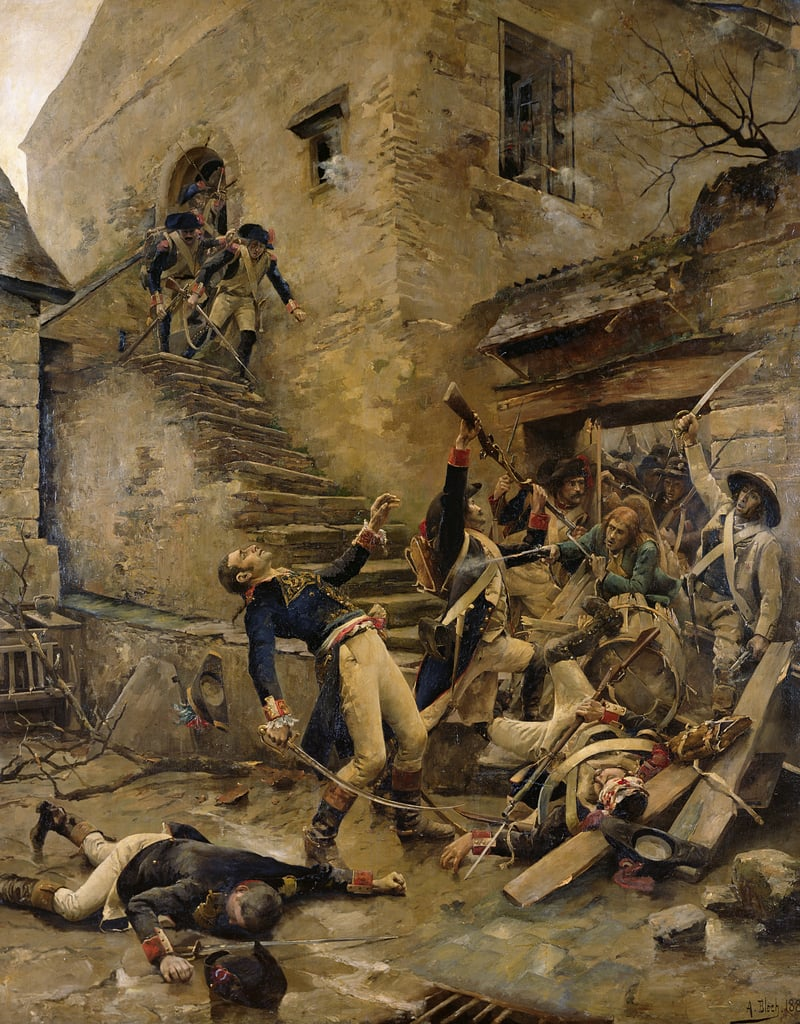
- Wounded General Beaupuy
Date	27 October 1793
Location	Entrammes, Mayenne, France
Result	Royalist victory

Belligerents
(France) French First Republic	(Kingdom of France) Vendée Royalist

Commanders and leaders
(France) Jean Léchelle (France) Jean-Baptiste Kléber (France) François Joseph Westermann (France) Michel de Beaupuy (WIA)	(Kingdom of France) Marquis de la Roche-Jacquelin (Kingdom of France) Charles Aimé de Royrand (DOW)

Strength
25,000	31,000

Casualties and losses
About 4,000 killed, wounded, or missing	About 2,100 killed or wounded

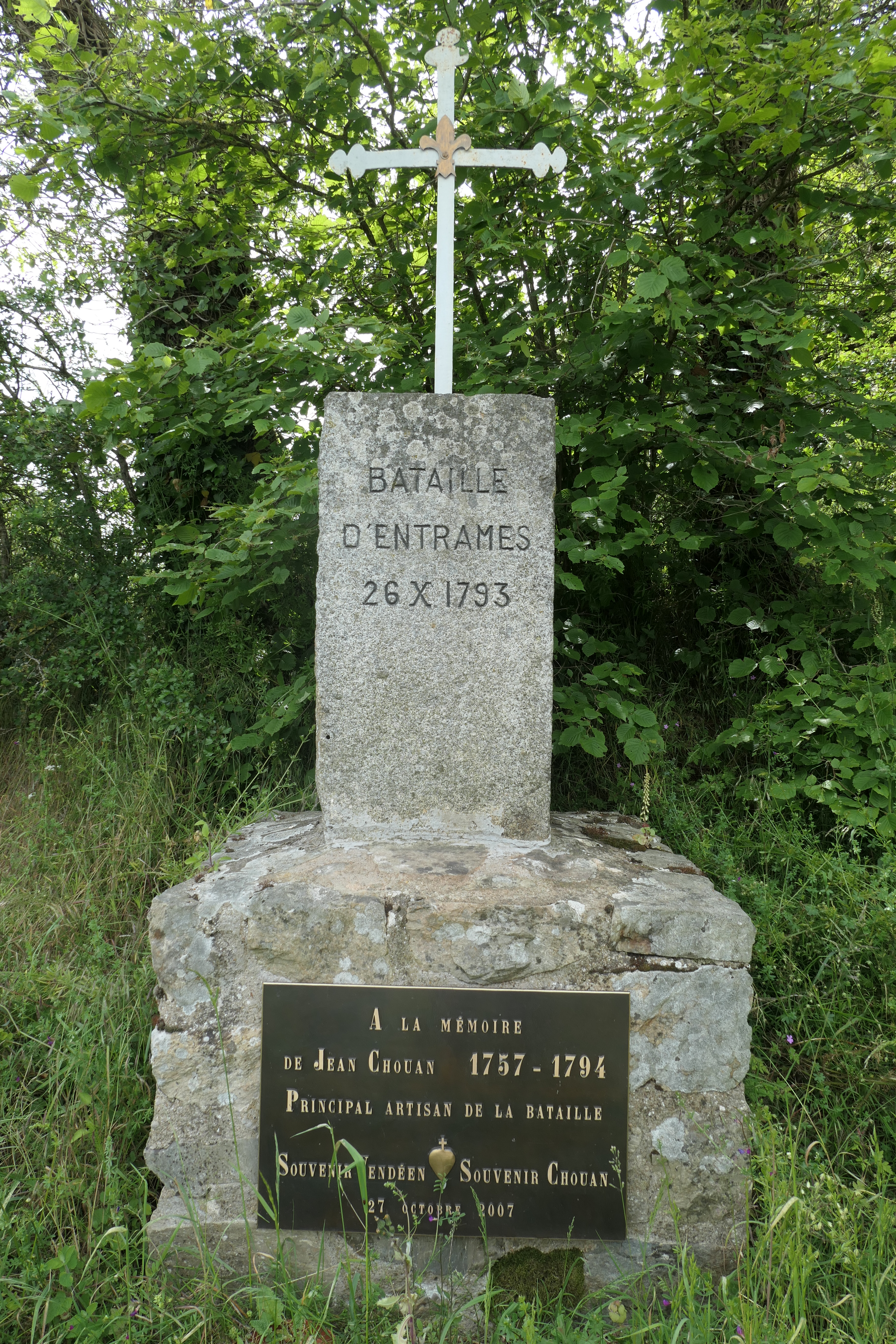
Monument remembering the battle.

The Battle of Entrames was fought on 27 October 1793 during the French Revolutionary Wars. It pitted Republican forces against Vendée Royalists near Entrames in Mayenne, and it resulted in a Royalist victory.
