= Chouan =

French nickname

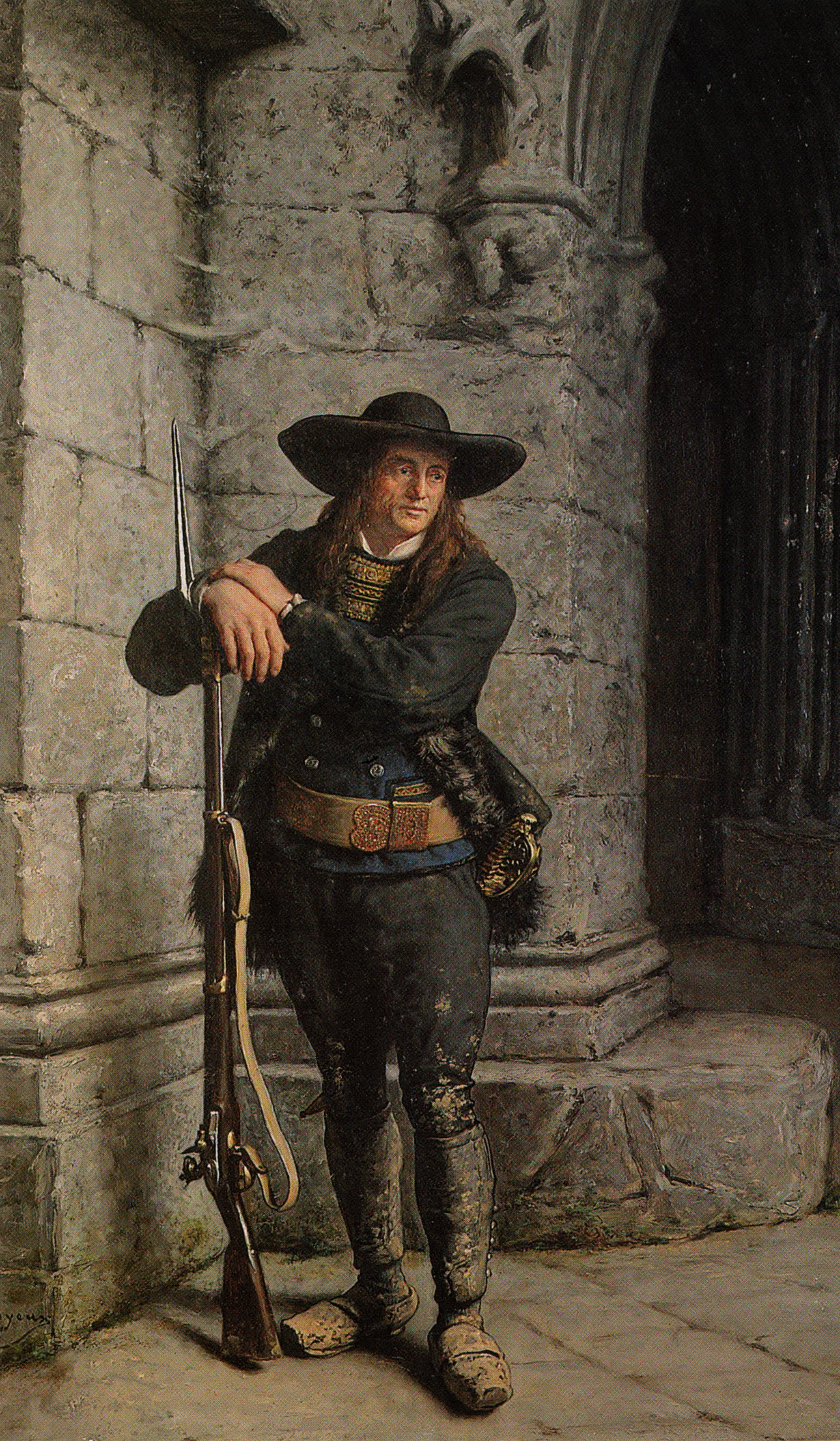
Breton sentinel in front of a church, painting of Charles Loyeux

Chouan (French pronunciation: [ʃwɑ̃], "the silent one", or "owl") is a French nickname. It was used as a nom de guerre by the Chouan brothers, most notably Jean Cottereau, better known as Jean Chouan, who led a major revolt in Bas-Maine against the French Revolution. Participants in this revolt – and to some extent French anti-revolutionary activists in general – came to be known as Chouans, and the revolt itself came to be known as the Chouannerie.

== Origin of the word ==
Jean Cottereau and his brothers all inherited the nickname Chouan from their father, a clog merchant and homme honorable from Saint-Berthevin in Mayenne, on the border with Brittany. One view is that this nickname originated from his talent for impersonating the cry of the owl (chouette in French), or specifically the tawny owl, which was called chat-huant in old French (French chat-huant), a designation that survived in the western langue d'oïl dialect spoken in Mayenne. According to another authority, the only reason the members of the Cottereau family had long borne the surname Chouan was that their grandparent was sad and taciturn by nature, and according to yet another, because they used owl-calls as warning and recognition signals whilst out on smuggling trips. Writing within living memory of the events, Jacques Duchemin des Cépeaux insisted that,

The surname of Chouan was given to Jean Chouan's grandfather because he was by nature taciturn and sad and because, at meetings, he kept himself out of the way in a corner. Since that time, the Cottereau family has maintained this surname. It was in turn given to all men who mustered to fight under the command of Jean Chouan, and finally to other royalists in arms in the western provinces. As for the account that the first Chouans imitated the cry of birds of the night to recognise and call each other, it is a supposition made by those who - not knowing the true explanation – nevertheless wanted to have some explanation to satisfy their curiosity... Maybe some insurgents had this idea which was suggested to them by their nickname. Although it is only some, it is to be noted that the bird formerly dedicated to armed wisdom became a sort of emblem for the bellicose piety of our peasants.

One possible reason the name was extended to the royalist troops of Maine, Normandy and Brittany is the riot at Saint-Ouën-des-Toits on 15 August 1792, in which (among others) Jean and René Cottereau participated. There, they signalled to the Laval authorities. Another is that the royalist troops mustered at night using the owl call as a signal.

== Spread ==
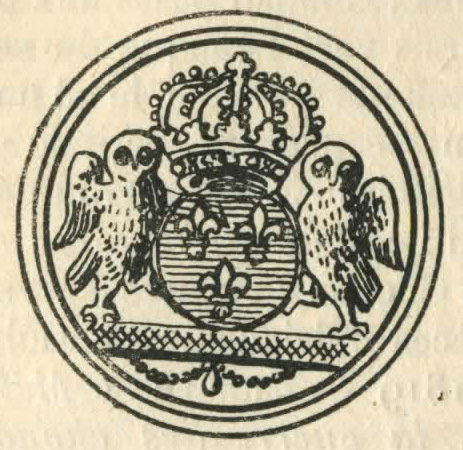
The arms of the Chouans

The opinion of some historians (including abbot Paulouin) writing on the revolt states that "the insurgents of the Sarthe did not receive the nickname Chouans, but took it up of their own accord at the beginning of their resistance career".

The 19th century historians – J.-J. M. Savary, J.-M. Lequinio the author of Mémoires d'un Administrateur des Armées Républicaines dans la Vendée – differed. Joseph de Puisaye, the best-informed on the topic after having been the Chouannerie's supreme commander, affirmed that the Chouan brothers gave their name to the revolt which they had first organised.

A curious shield of the revolt seems to bear a sort of official use of owls (also the emblem of Minerva) in representing the Chouannerie. It bore the arms of France, right, supported by two owls, with a double motto, IN SAPIENTIA ROBUR at the top, SIC REFLORESCENT at the bottom. It is to be found on some publications emanating from the "Royalist agencies in England", notably on the frontispiece of l’Almanach Royaliste pour l'année 1795, troisième du règne de Louis XVII, à Nantes (Londres) et se trouve dans toutes les villes de la Bretagne, de la Normandie, du Poitou, du Maine, du Perche, de l'Anjou, etc., et bientôt dans toute la France or, in English, "The Royalist Almanac for the year 1795, third year of the reign of Louis XVII, at Nantes (ie London) and found in all the towns of Brittany, Normandy, Poitou, Maine, Perche, Anjou, and soon throughout the whole of France".
