= Savenay =

Savenay Savenneg
- Commune
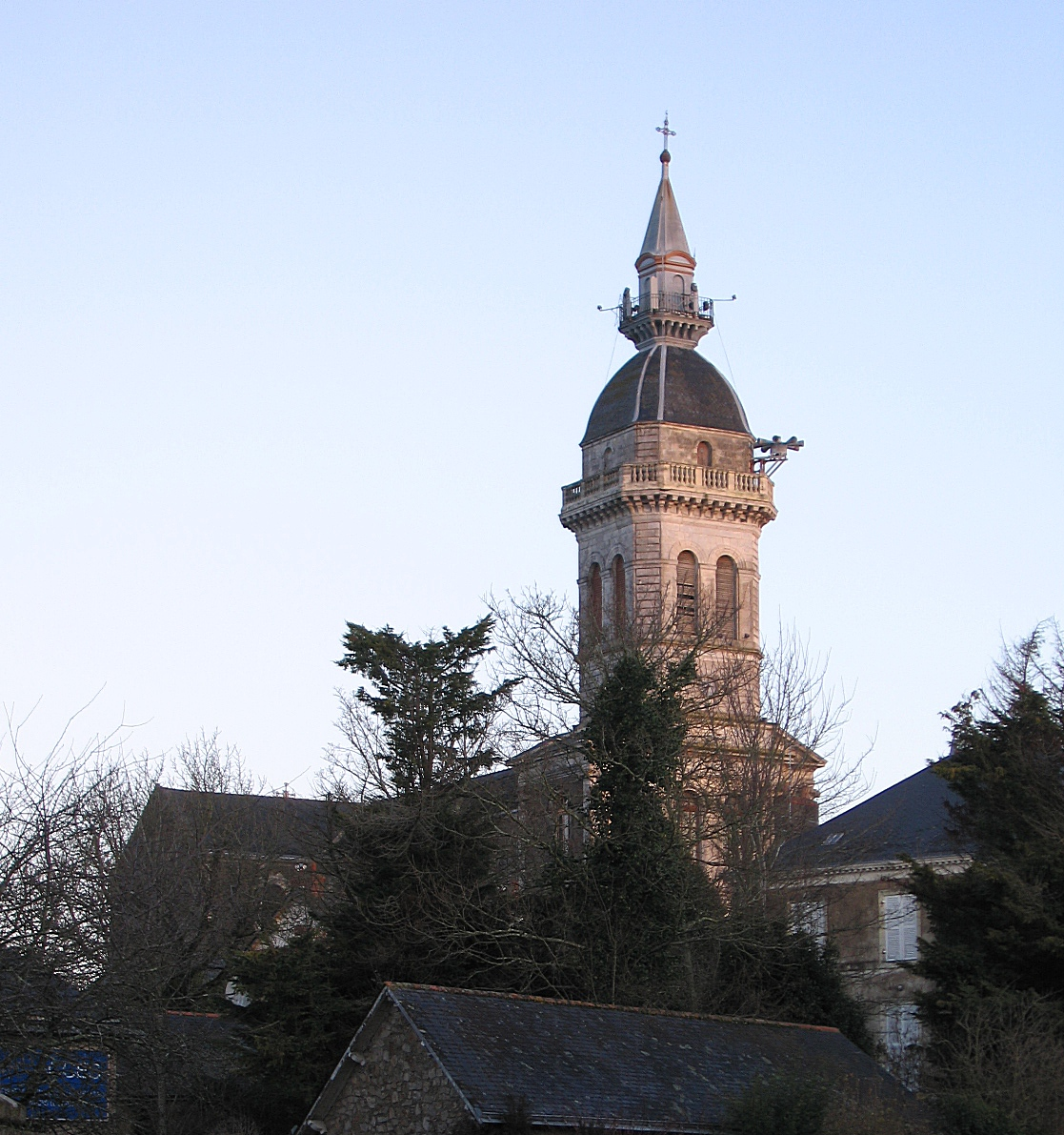
- The parish church of Saint-Martin-de-Tours, in Savenay

- Coat of arms
- Location of Savenay
- Location within France Location within Pays de la Loire
- Coordinates: 47°21′43″N 1°56′26″W
- Country: France
- Region: Pays de la Loire
- Department: Loire-Atlantique
- Arrondissement: Saint-Nazaire
- Canton: Blain
- Intercommunality: Estuaire et Sillon

Government
  - Mayor (2020–2026): Michel Mezard
- Area^{1}: 26 km^{2} (10 sq mi)
- Highest elevation: 86 m (282 ft)
- Lowest elevation: 0 m (0 ft)
- Population (2023): 9,543
  - Density: 370/km^{2} (950/sq mi)
- Time zone: UTC+01:00 (CET)
  - Summer (DST): UTC+02:00 (CEST)
- INSEE/Postal code: 44195 /44260
- ^{1} French Land Register data, which excludes lakes, ponds, glaciers > 1 km^{2} (0.386 sq mi or 247 acres) and river estuaries.

Savenay (French pronunciation: [sav(ə)nɛ]; Savenneg in Breton) is a town (administratively a commune) in the Loire-Atlantique department in western France which is part of the Pays de la Loire region. It is located on the Sillon de Bretagne (a mountain range defining the southern part of Brittany) and overlooks the marshes of the Loire river, seven kilometers to its south. Under the Old Regime, it was part of the province of Brittany.

== Geography ==
Savenay is in the west of the Loire-Atlantic, just north of the Loire estuary. It is 28 km east of Saint-Nazaire and the coast and 40 km from Nantes to its south east. It has good access by both car and train to both cities as well as elsewhere in the region. Towns close by include La Chapelle-Launay at 2.7 km, Prinquiau at 5.6 km, Bouée at 6 km, Lavau-sur-Loire at 7.4 km, Campbon at 10.4 km, Malville at 11.1 km, Quilly at 13.3 km.

=== Climate ===
Savenay climate is, like the rest of the Loire-Atlantique, a temperate oceanic climate. This climate is heavily influenced by the estuary of the Loire. Winters are mild (min 3 °C / Max 10 °C) and summers are mild (12 °C min / max 24 °C). Snowfall is rare. Rain is frequent (113 days per year of precipitation), with annual precipitation averaging about 743 mm, however rainfall is quite variable from one year to another. The average sunshine is 1826 hours per year. The presence of the Sillon de Bretagne, however, causes some local variations in the climate, with marsh areas generally colder than the rest of the town. This area is also often shrouded by fog in the winter.

== Businesses and commerce ==
In 2006, there were 366 companies in the area (excluding agriculture). The overwhelming majority (87%) were in trade and services. 92% of them were establishments with fewer than 10 employees. These establishments accounted for 1,691 salaried positions with an average of 4.62 per employee. In the agricultural sector, 44 farms make use of the 1562 hectares of farmland (in 2000) with cattle ranching dominating the agricultural activity.

== History ==
The Battle of Savenay on 23 December 1793 was the last, decisive battle of the Revolt in the Vendée during the French Revolution. In this battle the forces of the royalist counter-revolutionaries were irrevocably shattered.

During the first world war Savenay was home to a military hospital built by the American Army. As part of the hospital's infrastructure, a local stream was dammed creating the Mabille Valley Lake. The dam is still in place and the lake has become a popular recreation spot.

== Population ==
Historical population
Year	Pop.	±% p.a.
1968	4,317	—
1975	5,046	+2.25%
1982	5,679	+1.70%
1990	5,314	−0.83%
1999	5,883	+1.14%
2007	7,039	+2.27%
2012	7,945	+2.45%
2017	8,679	+1.78%
2023	9,543	+1.59%
Source: INSEE

== Sports ==
The town has a stadium, gymnasium, leisure center, golf course and racetrack. Tennis courts, swimming pool, tree-climbing site and fitness trail are also located in Savenay. Many other sports are available, such as cycling, football, basketball, weightlifting, handball, judo, karate, aikido, badminton, horseback riding, hiking, mountain biking, paintball, etc..

== See also ==
- André Bizette-Lindet

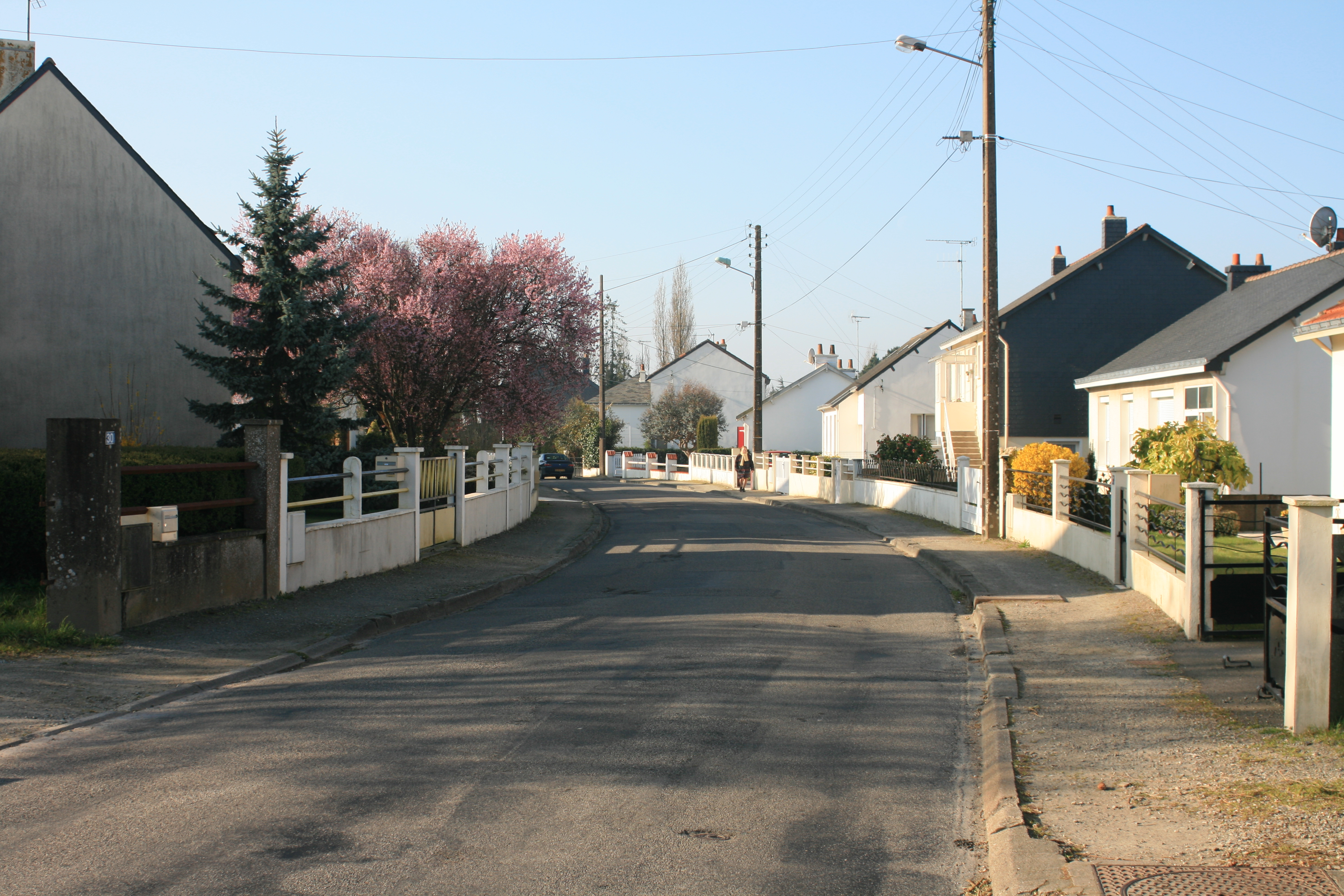
Example of housing in Savenay
