= Bouvron, Loire-Atlantique =

Bouvron Bolvronn (Breton)
- Commune
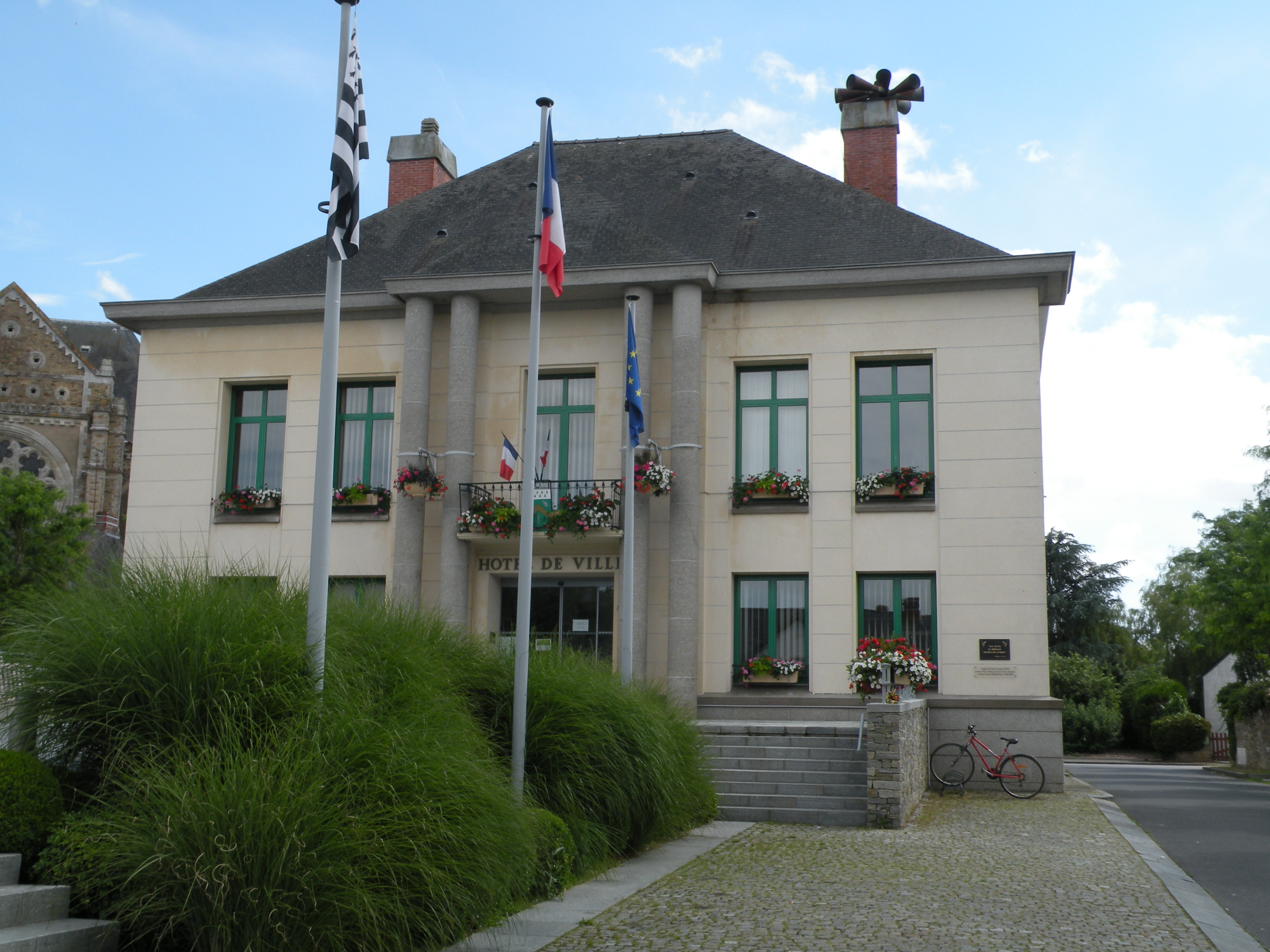
- Town hall

- Coat of arms
- Location of Bouvron
- Location within France Location within Pays de la Loire
- Coordinates: 47°25′07″N 1°50′48″W
- Country: France
- Region: Pays de la Loire
- Department: Loire-Atlantique
- Arrondissement: Châteaubriant-Ancenis
- Canton: Blain
- Intercommunality: CC Pays de Blain

Government
  - Mayor (2020–2026): Emmanuel Van Brackel
- Area^{1}: 47.63 km^{2} (18.39 sq mi)
- Highest elevation: 82 m (269 ft)
- Lowest elevation: 11 m (36 ft)
- Population (2023): 3,153
  - Density: 66.20/km^{2} (171.5/sq mi)
- Time zone: UTC+01:00 (CET)
  - Summer (DST): UTC+02:00 (CEST)
- INSEE/Postal code: 44023 /44130
- ^{1} French Land Register data, which excludes lakes, ponds, glaciers > 1 km^{2} (0.386 sq mi or 247 acres) and river estuaries.

Bouvron (French pronunciation: [buvʁɔ̃]; Breton: Bolvronn) is a commune in the Loire-Atlantique department in western France.

== Geography ==
Bouvron is near the following communes : Blain, Fay-de-Bretagne, Guenrouet, Savenay, Campbon and Quilly. The commune is near the Canal de Nantes à Brest and the forest of Gâvre.

Bouvron is situated 36 km to the east of Saint-Nazaire and 49 km to the north of Nantes.

== History ==
The tradition went that the name "Bouvron" derived from the word bovus (ox; cf French: boeuf) because Bouvron was anciently reputed for its fair for the trade of young oxen. and the merchants of these animals were known as the bouverons. But the name Boveron or Bouveron appeared in the texts only from the 12th century onwards, whereas in one text dated 8 May 878 from the cartulary of Redon Abbey, the name Buluuron is used for the estate when it was granted to the abbey, in Redon, Ille-et-Vilaine. An etymological study reveals that "Buluuron" is derived from the Gallic bébronnos, made up of bébros (= "beaver") and onnos (= "river").

== Population ==
Historical population

Year	Pop.	±% p.a.
1793	1,923	—
1821	2,317	+0.67%
1846	2,703	+0.62%
1872	3,012	+0.42%
1901	3,055	+0.05%
1926	2,499	−0.80%
1946	2,321	−0.37%
1962	2,278	−0.12%
1968	2,285	+0.05%

Year	Pop.	±% p.a.
1975	2,295	+0.06%
1982	2,334	+0.24%
1990	2,402	+0.36%
1999	2,411	+0.04%
2007	2,655	+1.21%
2012	2,961	+2.21%
2017	3,115	+1.02%
2023	3,153	+0.20%

Source: EHESS and INSEE (1968-2023)

== Sights ==
=== Monument of the surrender of the Poche of Saint-Nazaire 11 May 1945 ===
This monument is a reminder that the Second World War in Europe concluded on 11 May 1945 in Bouvron, in a field, and not in Berlin on 8 May 1945 (or 9 May for the Russians).

=== Castle of Quéhillac ===
A remarkable architectural ensemble of the 16th and 17th centuries composed of the castel, the chapel, the chaplain's home, the stables, the bridge and the moats. The ensemble is registered on the list of the French historical monuments "Monuments Historiques" since 22 November of 2002. In 1640, Nicolas Fouquet, finance's minister of Louis XIV married in his first wedding Louise Fourché de Quéhillac, who adduces him 160.000 livres as her dowry.

=== Castle of Launay-Bedeau ===
It was a medieval castle situated in the small village of Launay-Bedeau. It was simply a fortified tower with ramparts. In 1944, it was bombed. After the Second World War, it was skimmed over, in spite of the importance of this medieval cultural heritage. The stones were reused to build a farm, a pigpen and to gravel the small ways. The only vestiges you can see now are a doorstep, a tabernacle of the chapel and, of course, the beautiful moats of the castle.

=== Chapel of Saint-Julien ===
Situated in the hamlet of Saint-Julien, on the RD43 (departemental road), this chapel was raised on the lands of the monastery of Gavalais, a village at 2.5 km in the south-west of the chapel. It is dedicated to Saint Julien the Hospitalier and accommodate a statue of this saint in military costume. Damaged at the French Revolution, this chapel was many times renovated. Work to safeguard it were carried out in 1962.

=== Chapel of Saint-André ===
It is situated in the hamlet Le Châtel, at 1 km in south-east of Bouvron. It is dedicated to the first apostle of the Christ, St André, saint patron of the parish.

== Personalities ==
René Waldeck-Rousseau stayed numerous years in the familial secondary residence during his years out of politics.

Charles de Gaulle came to inaugurate the monument of the surrender of the Poche de Saint-Nazaire. The 2nd World War didn't finish the on 8 May 1945 in Berlin, but on 11 May 1945 in Bouvron, in a field.

== See also ==
- Communes of the Loire-Atlantique department
- The works of Jean Fréour. Sculptor "Le Bon Pasteur" for Saint-Sauveur church in Bouvron
