= Charles René Dominique Sochet, Chevalier Destouches =

French Navy officer (1727–1793)

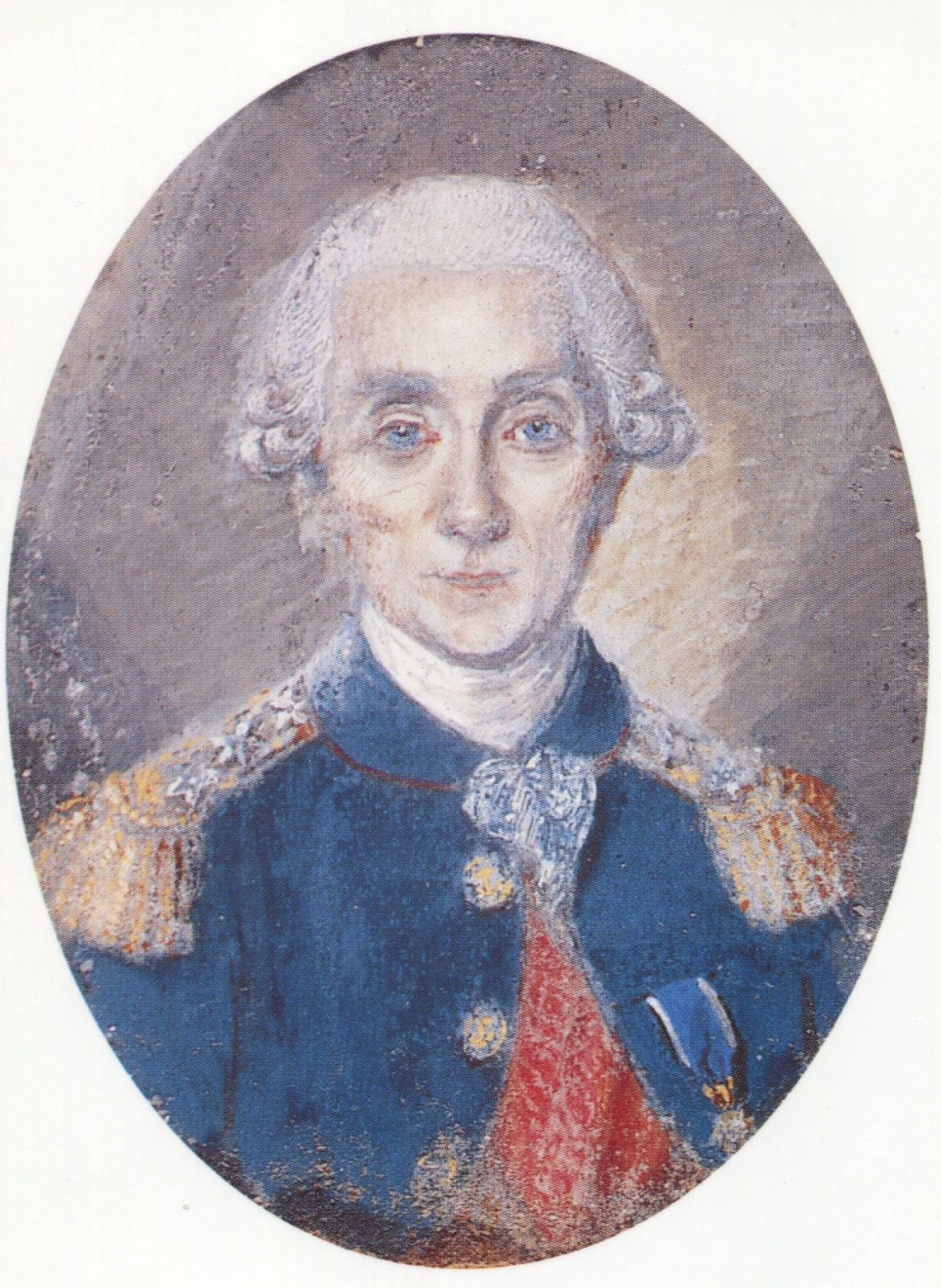
- Born: 7 October 1727; Luçon, Vendée, Kingdom of France
- Died: 23 December 1793 (aged 66) Prinquiau, French First Republic
- Allegiance: Kingdom of France
- Branch: French Navy
- Service years: 1743–1790
- Rank: Chef d'escadre
- Conflicts: American Revolutionary War; Battle of Cape Henry; Battle of the Saintes; French Revolutionary Wars; War in the Vendee
- Awards: Order of Saint Louis; Society of the Cincinnati

Charles René Dominique Sochet, Chevalier Destouches, also often spelled Des Touches, (French pronunciation: [ʃaʁl ʁəne dɔminik sɔʃɛ ʃəvalje detuʃ]; 7 October 1727 – 23 December 1793) was a Chef d'Escadre in the French Navy. He is most widely known for his participation in the War of American Independence, where he saw action in the Battle of Cape Henry in 1781 and in the Battle of the Saintes in 1782.

== Biography ==
Destouches was born in Luçon, in Vendée, in 1727. He joined the French Navy, and by 1767 was a Captain. In 1770 he married a young woman from Luçon; they had a son, Adrien, in 1772. His wife died while he was away at sea. After France entered the American War of Independence 1778, Destouches commanded the 74-gun Neptune, part of a fleet led by the Comte de Grasse that eventually occupied Newport, Rhode Island.

In 1781, now a rear admiral and in command of the Newport fleet, he led an attempt to deliver troops to Virginia to oppose those of the British general Benedict Arnold, who was engaged in the raids against economic and military targets there. This effort failed when he encountered the fleet of Admiral Mariot Arbuthnot in the Battle of Cape Henry, and drew away after several of his ships sustained significant damage. He served in 1782 under de Grasse in the Battle of the Saintes, a decisive naval victory for the British in the West Indies in which de Grasse was captured.

Returning to France after the war, Destouches married again in 1785, to Aimée-Prudence-Geneviève de Racodet. He was promoted to Chef d'Escadre in 1788, having spent 46 years at sea. When the French Revolution broke out, Destouches sided with the Royalists, and was drawn into counter-revolutionary activities in the Vendée in 1793. Briefly imprisoned, he was released by Royalist supporters, and he served as an advisor in the Battle of Savenay. He died during the winter in late 1793.
