= Siege of Acre (1799) =

1799 siege of French invasion of Egypt and Syria

- Part of the French invasion of Egypt and Syria
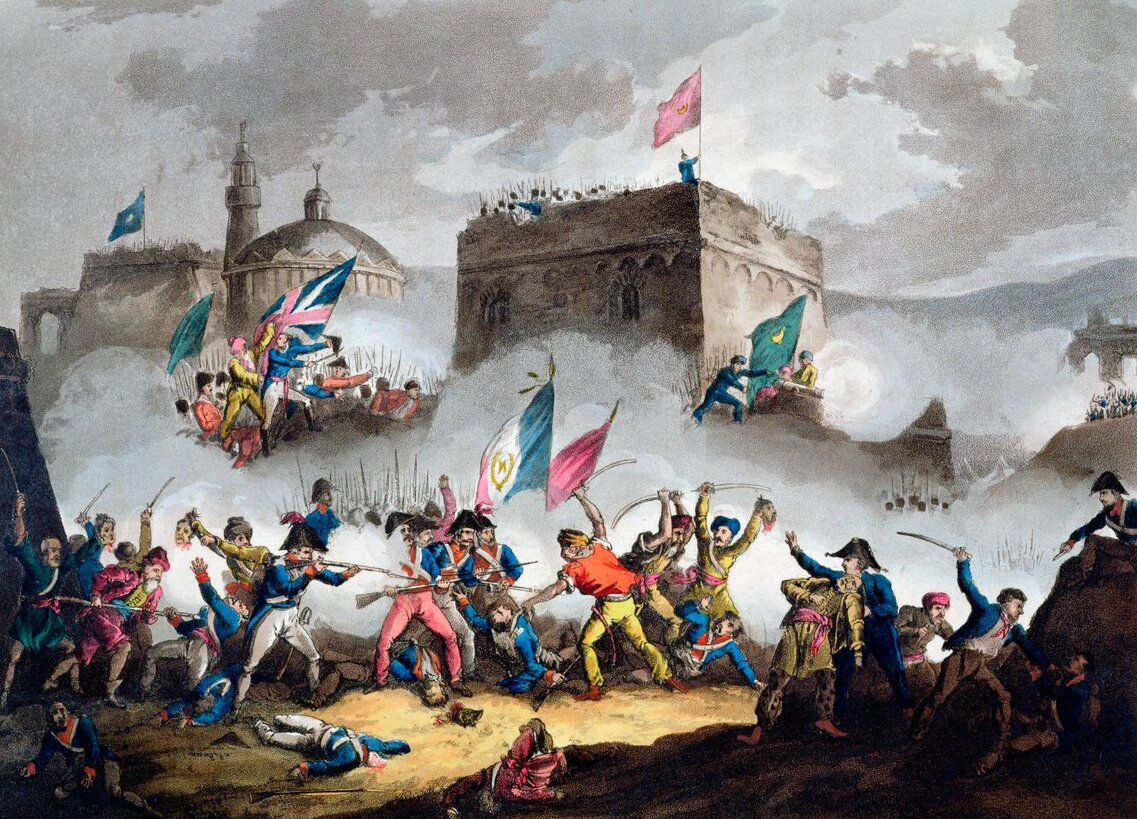
- French troops attacking Acre on 8 May 1799
Date	20 March – 21 May 1799
Location	Acre, Ottoman Syria 32.922°N 35.070°E
Result	Anglo-Ottoman victory

Belligerents
Ottoman Empire (Kingdom of Great Britain) Great Britain	(French First Republic) French Republic

Commanders and leaders
(Ottoman Empire) Jazzar Pasha (Ottoman Empire) Haim Farhi (Kingdom of Great Britain) Sidney Smith (Kingdom of Great Britain) Antoine de Phélippeaux	(French First Republic) Napoleon Bonaparte (French First Republic) Jean-Baptiste Kléber (French First Republic) Eugène de Beauharnais (WIA)

Units involved
(Ottoman Empire) Nizam-i Djedid (Garrison Force); Royal Navy	(French First Republic) Armée d'Orient

Strength
Garrison: 5,000 men Relief army (Mt. Tabor): 35,000–40,000; Support: 2 British ships of the line	12,000–13,000

Casualties and losses
2,000 (for the siege)	4,000 or 4,500: 2,300 killed; 2,200 wounded or ill
- Location within Mediterranean

War of the Second Coalition:
Egypt and Syria
current battle
Napoleon in command till 23 August 1799

The siege of Acre of 1799 was an unsuccessful French siege of the Ottoman city of Acre and was the turning point of Napoleon's invasion of Egypt and Syria, along with the Battle of the Nile. It was Napoleon's third tactical defeat in his career, being defeated at the Second Battle of Bassano and the Battle of Caldiero three years previously during the Italian campaign, and his first major strategic defeat, along with the last time he was defeated in battle for 10 years. As a result of the failed siege, Napoleon retreated two months later and withdrew to Egypt.

== Background ==
Acre was a site of significant strategic importance due to its commanding position on the route between Egypt and Syria. Bonaparte wanted to capture it following his invasion of Egypt. He hoped to incite a Syrian rebellion against the Ottomans and threaten British India. After the siege of Jaffa, which was followed by two days and nights of massacre and rape by the French forces, the defenders of the citadel were even more determined to resist the French.

== Siege ==
The French attempted to lay siege on 20 March using only their infantry. Napoleon believed the city would capitulate quickly to him. In correspondence with one of his subordinate officers he voiced his conviction that a mere two weeks would be necessary to capture the linchpin of his conquest of the Holy Land before marching on to Jerusalem.

However, the troops of the capable Jezzar Pasha, refusing to surrender, withstood the siege for one and a half months. Haim Farhi, al-Jazzar's Jewish adviser and right-hand man, played a key role in the city's defence, directly supervising the battle against the siege. After Napoleon's earlier capture of Jaffa, rampaging French troops had savagely sacked the captured city, and thousands of Albanian prisoners of war were ordered by Napoleon to be massacred on the sea-shore, prior to the French offensive further northwards. These facts were well known to the townspeople and defending troops (many of them Albanians) in Acre, and the prospect of being massacred is likely to have stiffened their resistance.

A Royal Navy flotilla under Commodore Sidney Smith, commanding Tigre, helped to reinforce the Ottoman defences and supplied the city with additional cannon manned by sailors and marines. Smith used his command of the sea to capture the French siege artillery being sent by a flotilla of gunboats from Egypt and to bombard the coastal road from Jaffa. The captured boats were:

Name	Fate
Dangereuse	Sold 1801
Deux Frères	Lost in a gale in May 1799
Foudre	Sold 1801
Marie-Rose	Sold 1801
Negresse	Sold 1802
Torride	Last listed 1802
Vierge-de-Grâce	Recaptured and scuttled May 1799

An artillery expert from the fleet, French émigré Antoine de Phélippeaux, then redeployed against Napoleon's forces the artillery pieces which the British had intercepted.

Smith anchored the British ships Tigre and Theseus so their broadsides could assist the Ottoman defence. British gunboats, which were of shallower draft, could come in closer, and together they helped repel repeated French assaults.

On 16 April an Ottoman relief force was fought off at Mount Tabor. By early May, replacement French siege artillery had arrived overland and a breach was forced in the defences. At the culmination of the assault, the besieging forces managed to make a breach in the walls.

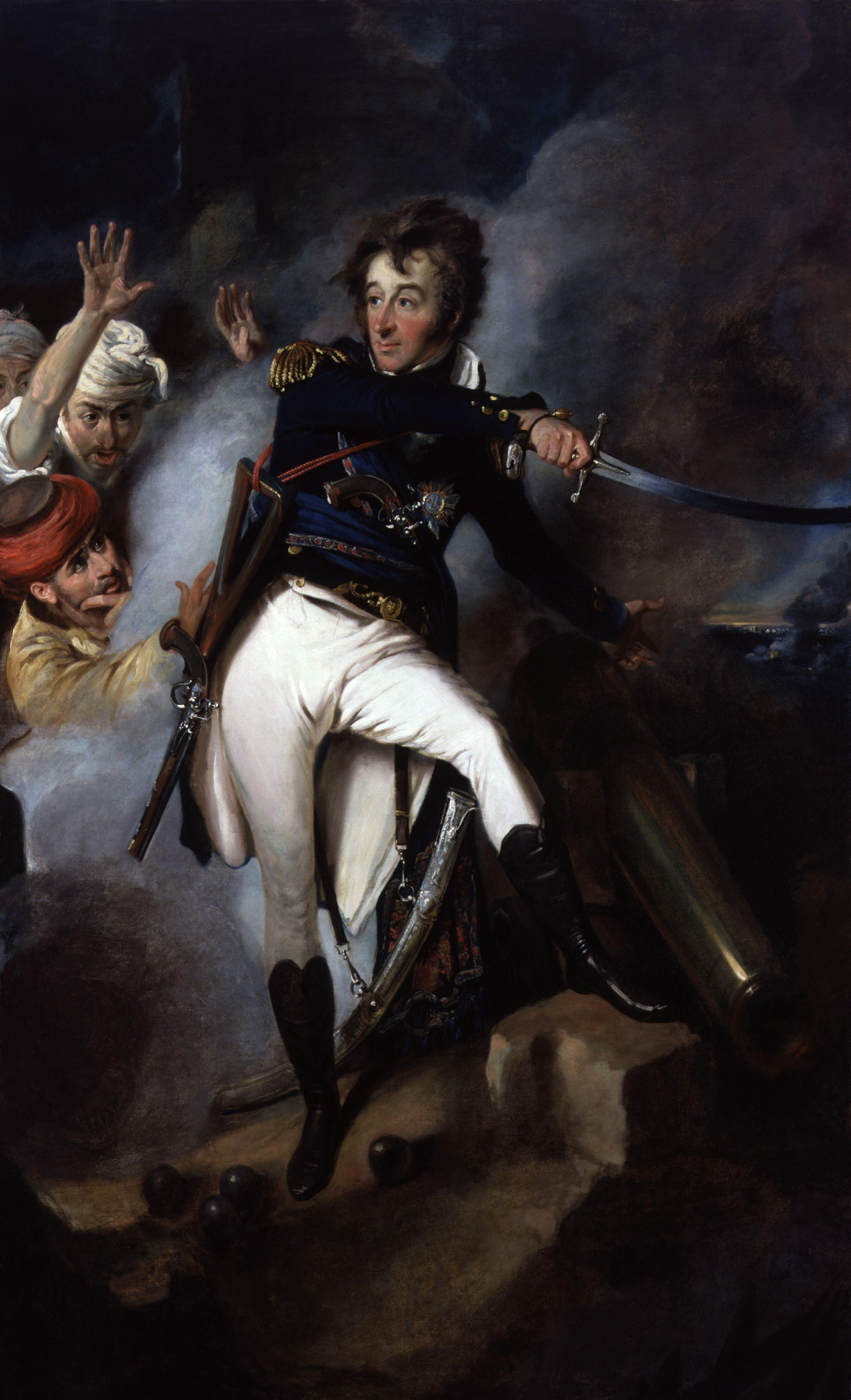
Sidney Smith at the walls of Acre

However, after suffering many casualties to open this entry-point, Napoleon's soldiers found, on trying to penetrate the city, that Farhi and de Phélippeaux had, in the meantime, built a second wall, several feet deeper within the city where al-Jazzar's garden was. Discovery of this new construction convinced Napoleon and his men that the probability of them taking the city was minimal. Moreover, after the assault was again repelled, Ottoman reinforcements from Rhodes were able to land.

Having underestimated the stubborn attitude of the defending forces combined with a British blockade of French supply harbours and harsh weather conditions, Napoleon's forces were left hungry, cold and damp. Plague had struck the French camp as a result of the desperate condition of the men, and had by now led to the deaths of about 2,000 soldiers.

Throughout the siege, both Napoleon and Jezzar sought in vain the assistance of the Shihab leader, Bashir—ruler of much of present-day Lebanon. Bashir remained neutral. As things turned out, it was the French which suffered most from the attitude of Bashir, whose intervention on their side might have turned the balance of power in their favour.

Finally, the siege was raised. Napoleon Bonaparte retreated two months later on 21 May after a failed final assault on 10 May, and withdrew to Egypt.

== Significance ==
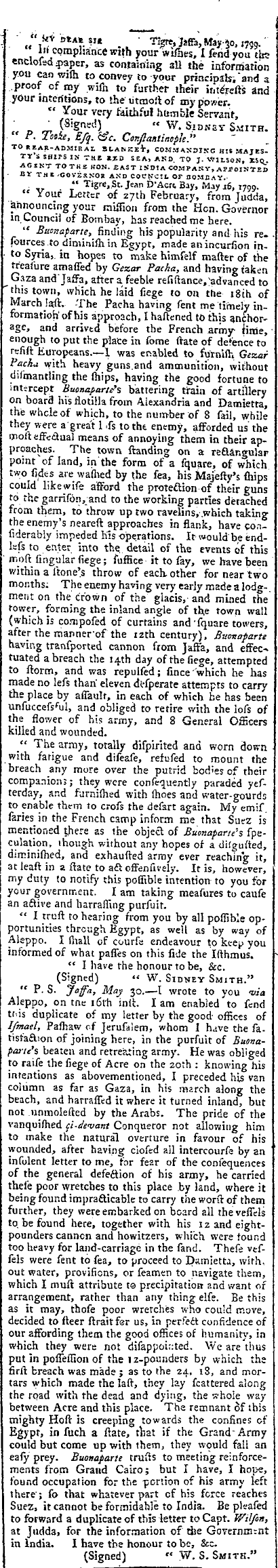
Sidney Smith's description of the siege of Acre, The Times, August 02, 1799

In 1805, Napoleon asserted that if he had

been able to take Acre [in 1799], I would have put on a turban, I would have made my soldiers wear big Turkish trousers, and I would have exposed them to battle only in case of extreme necessity. I would have made them into a Sacred Battalion—my Immortals. I would have finished the war against the Turks with Arabic, Greek, and Armenian troops. Instead of a battle in Moravia, I would have won a Battle of Issus, I would have made myself emperor of the East, and I would have returned to Paris by way of Constantinople.

The allusions from Classical Antiquity included in the speech are to the Sacred Band of Thebes and the Persian Immortals—elite units of, respectively, the city state of Thebes and the Achaemenid Kings of Persia; and to the Battle of Issus where Alexander the Great decisively defeated the latter. (In fact, though Acre was not conquered, Napoleon's Imperial Guard did come to be informally called "The Immortals".)

Whether or not Napoleon would have been able to carry out the above grand design, it is likely that had he taken Acre he might have remained a considerable further time in the East, would not have returned to France in 1799 and hence would not have carried out later that year the coup which established him in power as First Consul. He might have still taken power in France, later on and under different circumstances, or in his absence someone else might have overthrown the shaky rule of the Directorate. Either way, the later history of France and of Europe might have been substantially different. Also, whether or not Napoleon would have managed to make himself Emperor of the East and reach Constantinople, his energetically trying to do that would have certainly had a substantial effect on the Ottoman Empire's history.

Some hold that a statement attributed to Napoleon during the war, according to which he promised to return the land to the Jews if he were to succeed in his conquest of Palestine, was meant to capture the attention of Farhi, a Syrian Jew, and betray his master by switching his support to the French. Whether this is true or not, Farhi defended the city with the rest of the Ottoman forces.

Napoleon showed great interest in winning over the Jews during the campaign, including the account of Las Cases in "Mémorial de Sainte Hélène" about Napoleon's military campaign records that it was reported among Syrian Jews that after Napoleon took Acre, he would go to Jerusalem and restore Solomon's Temple and decrees were passed in favour of Jews (and Coptic Christians and women) in French-controlled Egypt.

== Legacy ==
In present-day Acre, the hill on which Napoleon set his camp, south-east of the city walls of Acre, is still known as "Napoleon's Hill" (גבעת נפוליון). Acre also has a Napoleon Bonaparte Street (רחוב נפוליון בונפרטה), the only city in Israel with such a street name.

Among the Arab population of the Old City of Acre, the knowledge of their forebears having successfully withstood the barrage of such a world-famous conqueror is a source of civic pride and local patriotism. In a folk tale circulated by Acre Arabs, Napoleon, upon lifting the siege of Acre, let a cannon shoot his hat into the city "so that at least a part of him would enter into Acre".

== Gallery ==
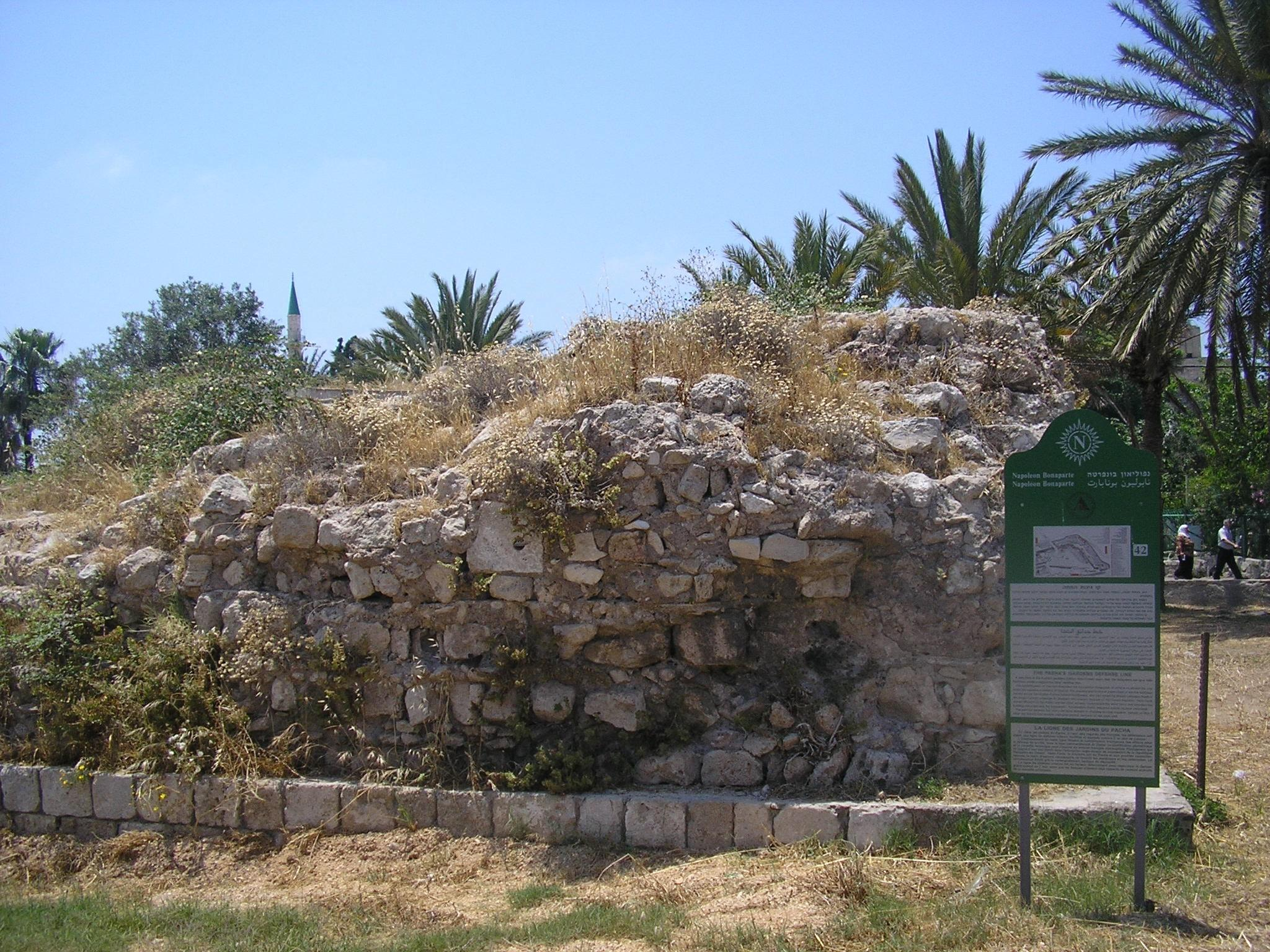
The remains of the internal fortification line erected by Farhi and de Phélippeaux within the walls of Acre during Napoleon's siege, May 1799.

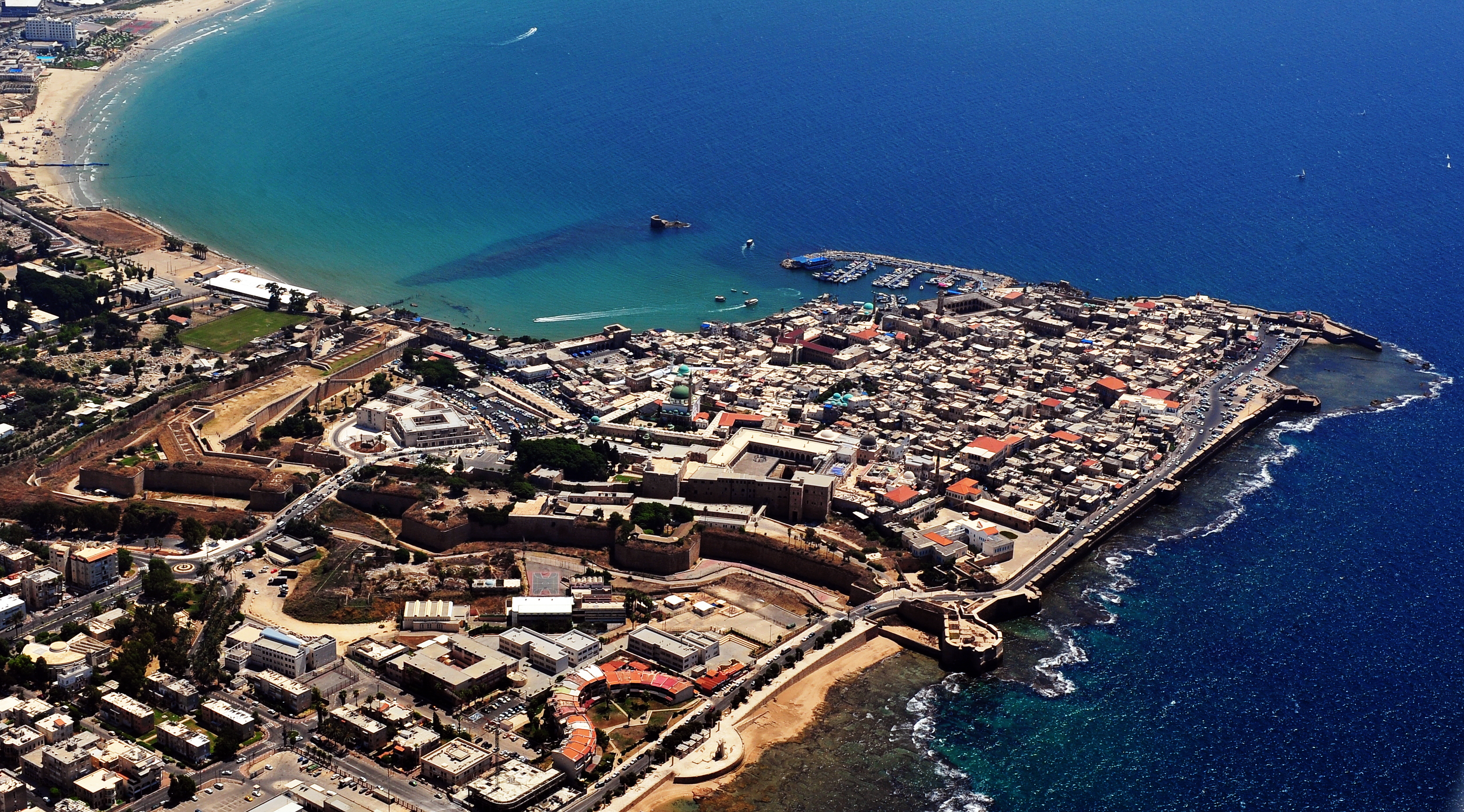
The general outlook of Old Acre, seen here in a present-day view from above, has changed little since 1799

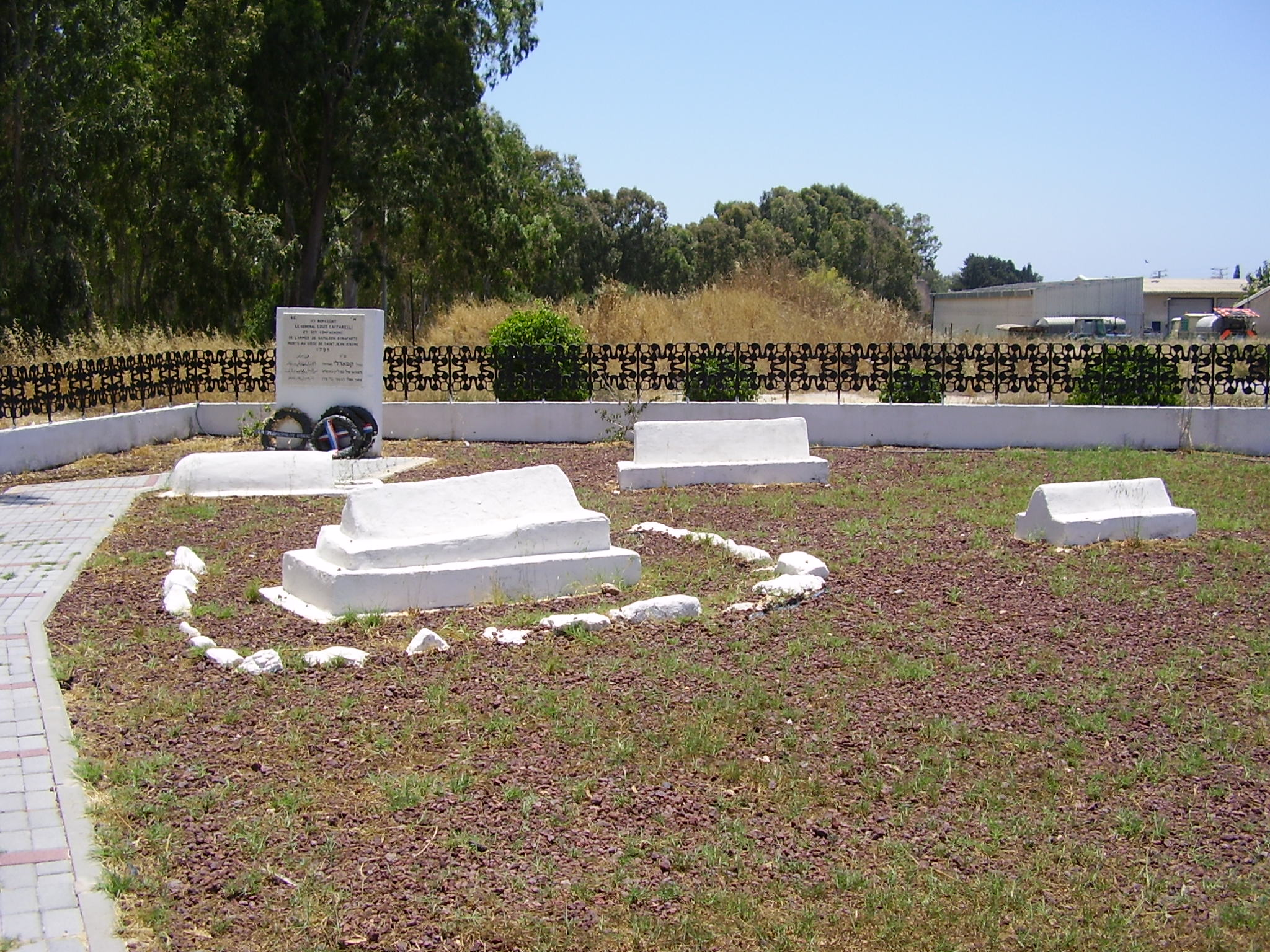
Cemetery for Napoleon's soldiers in Acre, including the grave of General Caffarelli

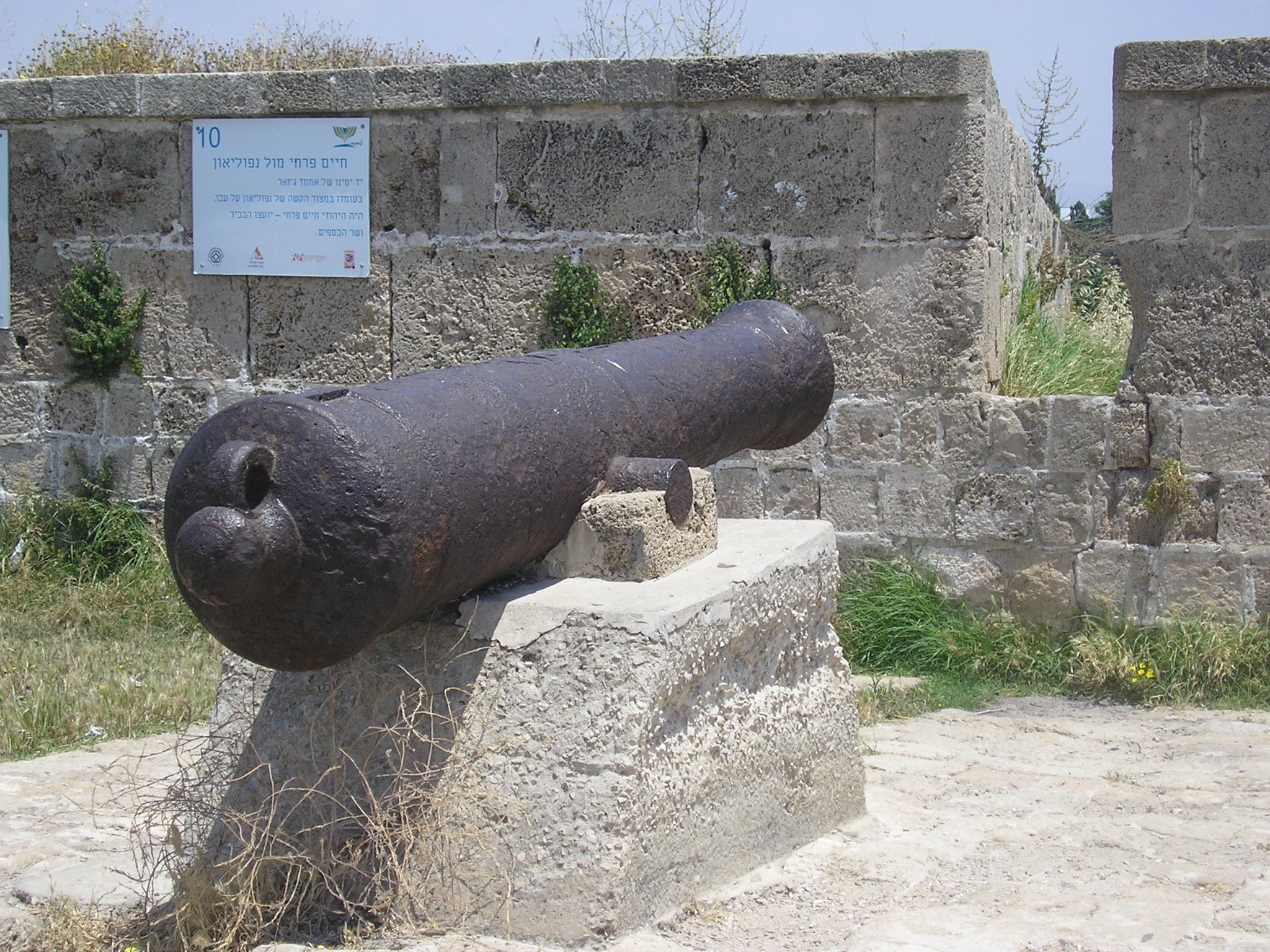
19th-century cannon, set in the wall of Acre near a sign commemorating Farhi. The Hebrew inscription on the sign reads: "Farhi vs. Napoleon. Jezzar's right hand in resisting Napoleon's harsh siege was the Jewish Haim Farhi, senior adviser and minister of finance"

== Notes ==
Preceded by War of the Second Coalition	French Revolution: Revolutionary campaigns Siege of Acre (1799)	Succeeded by Battle of Ostrach
