= Battle of Savenay =

Part of the French Revolution

Coordinates: 47°21′39″N 1°57′00″W

- Part of the War in the Vendée (Virée de Galerne)
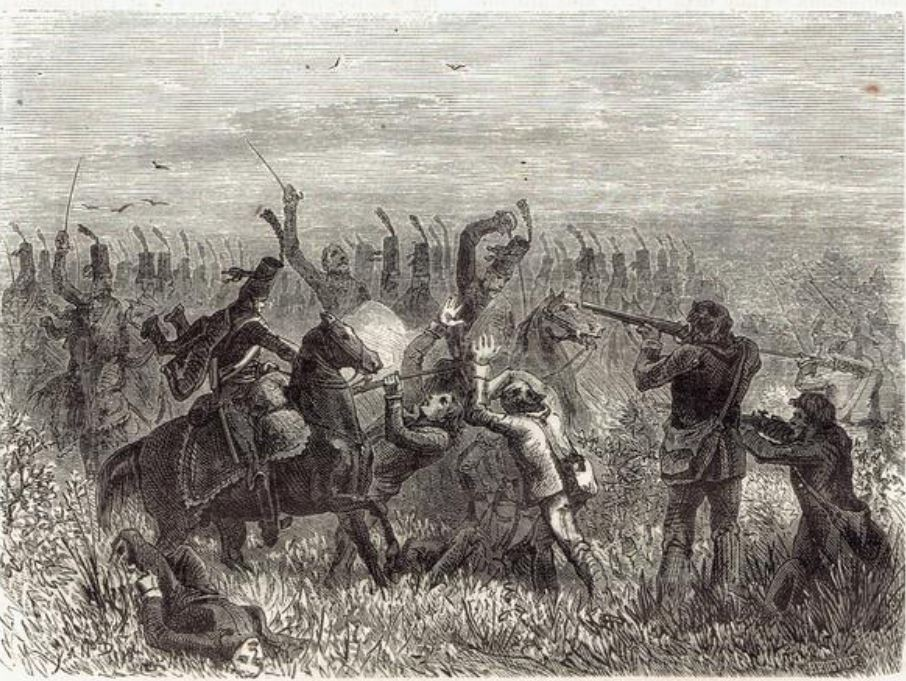
- Complete destruction of the Vendéens at Savenay by Yan' Dargent, 1866
Date	23 December 1793
Location	Savenay (Loire-Inférieure)
Result	Republican victory

Belligerents
(France) French Republic	Vendéens; Chouans

Commanders and leaders
François Marceau; Jean Kléber; Simon Canuel; Jacques Tilly; F.-J. Westermann; Michel de Beaupuy; Pierre Verger; François Muller; Marc Scherb; Pierre Prieur; Pierre Bourbotte; Jean-Baptiste Carrier	Jacques Fleuriot; Bernard de Marigny; Lyrot †; Georges Cadoudal

Strength
18,000 soldiers	6,000 soldiers, 7 guns 4,000–6,000 non-combatants

Casualties and losses
30 dead, 200 wounded	4,000–6,000 dead 2,000–4,000 captured Most prisoners executed

The Battle of Savenay took place on 23 December 1793, and marks the end of the Virée de Galerne operational phase of the first war in the Vendée after the French Revolution. A Republican force of approximately 18,000 decisively defeated the Armée Catholique et Royale force of 6,000 at Savenay.

== Prelude ==
After a crushing defeat at the battle of Le Mans on 12 December 1793, a few thousand Vendéens fled to Laval and then to Ancenis, hoping to cross the Loire back into Vendée. Without boats, crossing the river was impossible. Hence the Vendéens built small boats and approximately 4,000 people, including Henri de La Rochejaquelein and Jean-Nicolas Stofflet, managed to cross before the arrival of Republican ships. The Vendéen rear guard was stranded to the north of the Loire and tried another way around. They went to Blain, 35 km north of Nantes, but had to go back towards Savenay, 30 km west of Nantes.

== The eve of the battle ==
Savenay was taken by the Vendéens early morning of 22 December, with practically no fighting. The 150 republican soldiers quickly pulled back after a small skirmish with the Vendéen first line and the town's population was evacuated. At 09:00, the royalists prepared the defenses of the town. The republicans under François-Joseph Westermann were the first to arrive, at 11:00. They attacked but were pushed back after a small skirmish. At noon, Jean-Baptiste Kléber and François-Séverin Marceau arrived with the greater part of the Republican army. Another skirmish was fought for control of the Touchelais woods, to the northeast of Savenay, which the Republicans won.

Those were the last skirmishes of the day because a fog rose during the afternoon; the Republicans kept their positions. At nightfall some représentants en mission, Pierre-Louis Prieur, Louis Marie Turreau, and Pierre Bourbotte, arrived at the Republican camp. Surprised at the troops' inaction, they ordered military engagement so as to not allow the enemy to rest; Westermann agreed. A war council was held at which Kléber insisted they had to wait for sunrise before attacking; Marceau sided with Kléber and managed to convince Pierre-Louis Prieur. The Republicans took advantage of the night to deploy. At 02:00, Tilly's division, which came from Vannes, arrived and deployed in time. Simon Canuel commanded the left flank, Kléber the middle-left, Marceau the middle-right, and Tilly the right. Apart from a few passages to the south of the town, the Vendéens were surrounded.

== Battle ==
At sunrise, the battle started, but it was the Vendéens and Chouans who unexpectedly launched it, in order to take the Touchelais woods and not be surrounded. The attack was commanded by Lyrot de la Patouillère and saw success: two cannons were captured along with 40 prisoners. Soon after, Kléber launched a counter-attack with his Gendarmes regiment, charging with bayonets and forcing the Vendéens to pull back to the gates of Savenay. In the center, Marceau, commanding the légion des Francs and Chasseurs de Kastel, encountered difficulties and was for a moment restrained by the Vendéen artillery.

On their respective fronts, Simon Canuel, Jacques Louis François Delaistre Tilly and Westermann also launched attacks, putting pressure on the Royalists on all sides. Soon, the Republicans entered the town despite the resistance of Gaspard de Bernard de Marigny's artillery. Street combat took place amid great confusion, house by house; numerous Vendéen families participated in the fighting. The Vendéen artillery deployed in front of the church and managed to hold their ground for a while. Jacques Nicolas Fleuriot de La Fleuriais tried an ultimate counter-attack, he picked 200 to 300 cavalrymen, commanded by Georges Cadoudal, with Pierre-Mathurin Mercier and a few infantrymen. They attacked and pierced Tilly's lines and tried to attack Republican lines along their flank, but the Republican reserves arrived and forced the cavalrymen to retreat.

During that time, on the church square, the Republicans took control of the cannon and turned it against the Vendéens. They fled, pursued by the Republicans, retreating out of Savenay and regrouping to the west of the town (the battle's commemorative cross marks that place). The Vendéens took their last two remaining cannons, which Marigny had kept in reserve, and tried to cover the retreat of the wounded and non-combatants. During this engagement, Lyrot was killed. Marigny retreated again, west to the Blanche-Couronne woods, with his two cannons and what was left of his men. He held his position for an hour, then cheered with his men in the marsh, for he had managed to escape. To the northwest, a group of 600 Vendéens managed to hold at the Butte des Vignes and retreated later to the Blanche-Couronnes woods but they were encircled mid-way by a corps of the Armagnac regiment and were massacred.

Inside Savenay, the town was searched and hundreds of elders, women, and children were taken out of their houses and locked in the church before their trials. The wounded of both sides were brought to the Saint-Armel hospital and taken care of. By 14:00, the battle was over.

== The flight and massacres ==
After the battle, Kléber marched in Nantes to celebrate the victory with most of the troops. Yet the republican cavalry under Marceau and Westermann chased the Vendéens, searching the neighboring villages and the countryside, killing or capturing those left behind.

During the search, the brigadier general Alexis Antoine Charlery attacked a position held by 500 Vendéens but failed to defeat them. He proposed that they surrender in exchange for the right to go home unimpeded, a proposition that they accepted and signed. The prisoners were sent to Nantes for ratification of the arrangement by a Représentant en mission, but he refused and had the prisoners shot and general Charlery arrested. He was later freed and reassigned.

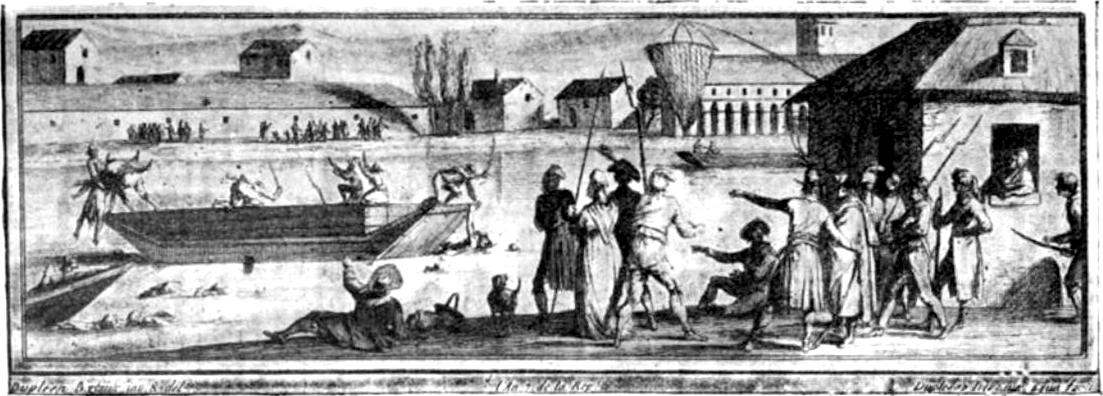
The drownings at Savenay during the War in the Vendée, 1793

The Bignon Commission which arrived during the day was given the task of judging the prisoners. The commission worked for 3 days and ordered the execution of all the Vendéen combatants caught bearing arms. The executions started that same evening and lasted eight days, but the number executed is unknown. According to official statistics, they numbered 662, but there are doubts as to whether or not this number only reflects those executed during the 3 first days. The représentant en mission Benaban wrote that more than 2,000 were shot. Similarly, General François Carpantier boasted that he had 1,500 people executed. The 1,679 women and children were sent to prisons in Nantes. Some officers, such as Kléber and Savary, asked Carrier to spare them, but Carrier refused to listen and had them all shot or drowned.

Other massacres took place in the countryside. Westermann and his hussards shot 500 to 700 prisoners, men, women, and children, at the Sem forest near Prinquiau. Westermann, nicknamed the "butcher of the Vendéens" supposedly wrote to the Committee of Public Safety:

There is no more Vendée, Republican citizens. It died beneath our free sword, with its women and its children. I have just buried it in the swamps and the woods of Savenay. Following the orders that you gave to me, I crushed the children beneath the horses' hooves, massacred the women who, those at least, will bear no more brigands. I do not have a single prisoner to reproach myself with. I have exterminated them all...

Nonetheless, some Vendéens were lucky enough to manage to escape, helped by the local population. Jean Legland, a ferryman on the Loire, declared in 1834 that he helped 1,258 escapees pass in the days following the battle of Savenay. This was confirmed by written testimonies by the Abbé Bernier. In total, 2,500 people might have survived the battle.

== Consequences ==
The battle marked the end of the Virée de Galerne, and definitively ended the threat of Vendée to the republic. Yet fighting continued in Vendée. General Marceau, outraged by his soldiers' behavior, asked to be transferred. Marceau was soon replaced by Kléber as general of the Army of the West, and thereafter by Louis Marie Turreau. Guerrilla fighting continued for some time between the Vendéens and the Republican infernal columns.

== In popular culture ==
Jules Verne described the battle at the beginning of his historical novel Le Comte de Chanteleine (1862).

== Sources ==
- Fernand Guériff, La bataille de Savenay dans la Révolution, éditions Jean-Marie Pierre, Le Pouliguen, 1988, ISBN 2903999082
- Jacques Crétineau-Joly, Histoire de la Vendée Militaire, 1840
- Jean-Baptiste Kléber, Mémoires politiques et militaires 1793–1794, 1794
- Jean-Clément Martin, Blancs et Bleus dans la Vendée déchirée, Gallimard, coll. "Découvertes Gallimard" (n° 8), 1986
- Roger Dupuy, Nouvelle histoire de la France contemporaine, vol. 2 : La République jacobine. Terreur, guerre et gouvernement révolutionnaire, 1792–1794, Seuil, 2005
