= Simon Canuel =

French general

- Born: 29 October 1767; Les Trois-Moutiers
- Died: 11 May 1840 (aged 72); Loudun
- Military career
- Allegiance: Kingdom of France (1787–1791); Constitutional Cabinet of Louis XVI (1791–1792); First French Empire (1792–1804); First French Empire (1804–1806); First Restoration (1814–1815); Catholic and Royal Army (1815); Second Restoration (1815–1830)
- Service years: 1787–1830
- Rank: General
- Conflicts: War of the Vendée (1793-96); Battle of Savenay; War of the Vendée (1815); Battle of Échaubrognes; Battle of Aizenay; Battle of Saint-Gilles-sur-Vie; Battle of Mathes; Battle of Thouars; Spanish Expedition
- Awards: Grand Officer of the Legion of Honor; Chevalier de Saint-Louis

Simon Canuel (29 October 1767 – 11 May 1840) was a French general of the Revolutionary and Napoleonic Wars.

== Biography ==
Canuel was born in Les Trois-Moutiers, in the Vienne.

=== French Revolutionary Wars ===
He entered military service on January 3, 1787, as a soldier in the Limousin regiment, and he earned all his military ranks in the War in the Vendée, as he was promoted by Jean Antoine Rossignol and Jean-Baptiste Kléber, to become a general. He fought along with Louis Blosse and Pierre François Verger-Dubareau during the battle of Savenay.

In April 1796, general-in-chief, Canuel led the campaign against a counter-revolutionary movement in Sancerrois, led by Antoine Le Picard de Phélippeaux.

=== First Empire ===
Napoleon I decided not to put Canuel on active service, keeping him in command of various quiet strongholds. Bored at the inaction, he went over to the Bourbons in 1814 and so during the Hundred Days the following year had to take refuge among the Royalist insurgents of the Vendée.

Later on, he took part in several conflicts, including the Hundred Thousand Sons of Saint Louis mission in Spain.

== Death ==
He died on May 11, 1840, in Loudun.

== Sources ==
- Marie-Nicolas Bouillet and Alexis Chassang (ed.s), "Simon Canuel" in Dictionnaire universel d’histoire et de géographie, 1878
- Mullié, Charles (1852). "Canuel (Simon)" . Biographie des célébrités militaires des armées de terre et de mer de 1789 à 1850 (in French). Paris: Poignavant et Compagnie.
