= French tartane Marie-Rose =

French Navy vessel

The French tartane Marie-Rose (or Marie) was a tartane that the French Navy requisitioned in March 1798 at Marseille and commissioned as a transport of four guns and 22 men. The British Royal Navy captured her in March 1799 off Syria and her captors took her into service as the gunbrig HMS Marie Rose. The Royal Navy disposed of her in 1800.

== British service ==
Marie-Rose was one of a flotilla of seven vessels that Commodore Sir Sidney Smith in HMS Tigre took at Acre on 18 March 1799, all of which the British took into service. At capture Marie-Rose (or Maria Rose) carried four guns and had a crew of 22 men.

The flotilla of gun-vessels was carrying siege artillery and other siege supplies to reinforce Napoleon's troops besieging Acre. Smith immediately put the guns and supplies to use to help the denizens of the city resist the French, and the gun-vessels to harass them.

Smith anchored Tigre and HMS Theseus, one on each side of the town, so their broadsides could assist the defence. The gun-vessels were of shallower draft and so could come in closer. Together, they helped repel repeated French assaults. The French attacked multiple times between 19 March and 10 May before Napoleon finally gave up. On 21 May he destroyed his siege train and retreated back to Egypt, having lost 2,200 men dead, 1,000 of them to the plague.

After Napoleon's failure at Acre, Smith sailed with his squadron on 12 June. He proceeded first along the coast to Beruta road, and then to Larnica road, Cyprus, in order to refit his little squadron. He and Tigre then departed for Constantinople; the gun-vessels remained in the theatre.

== See also ==
- Siege of Acre (1799)
- List of gun-vessels Commodore Sir Sidney Smith captured at Acre in March 1799
