= Le Temple-de-Bretagne =

- Commune
- World War I Memorial.

- Coat of arms
- Location of Le Temple-de-Bretagne
- Location within France Location within Pays de la Loire
- Coordinates: 47°19′44″N 1°47′20″W
- Country: France
- Region: Pays de la Loire
- Department: Loire-Atlantique
- Arrondissement: Nantes
- Canton: Blain
- Intercommunality: Estuaire et Sillon

Government
  - Mayor (2020–2026): Pascal Martin
- Area^{1}: 1.72 km^{2} (0.66 sq mi)
- Highest elevation: 90 m (300 ft)
- Lowest elevation: 77 m (253 ft)
- Population (2023): 1,975
  - Density: 1,150/km^{2} (2,970/sq mi)
- Demonym(s): Templiers, Templières
- Time zone: UTC+01:00 (CET)
  - Summer (DST): UTC+02:00 (CEST)
- INSEE/Postal code: 44203 /44360
- ^{1} French Land Register data, which excludes lakes, ponds, glaciers > 1 km^{2} (0.386 sq mi or 247 acres) and river estuaries.

Le Temple-de-Bretagne (French pronunciation: [lə tɑ̃pl də bʁətaɲ]; lit. 'The Temple of Brittany'; Breton: Templ-Breizh) is a commune in the Loire-Atlantique department in Pays de la Loire in western France.

== Population ==
Historical population
| Year | Pop. | ±% p.a. |
|---|---|---|
| 1968 | 519 | — |
| 1975 | 612 | +2.38% |
| 1982 | 1,009 | +7.40% |
| 1990 | 1,420 | +4.36% |
| 1999 | 1,557 | +1.03% |
| 2007 | 1,798 | +1.82% |
| 2012 | 1,865 | +0.73% |
| 2017 | 1,967 | +1.07% |
| 2023 | 1,975 | +0.07% |
Source: INSEE

== See also ==
- Communes of the Loire-Atlantique department
