= Abdallah Bey =

Ottoman Governor of Jaffa

Abdallah Bey (died 1799, Jaffa) was an Ottoman Arab statesman who served as the governor of Jaffa in the Sidon Eyalet under Wāli Ahmad Pasha al-Jazzar in the late 18th century.

During the French campaign in Egypt and Syria, Napoleon Bonaparte ordered his troops to seize Jaffa to cement the recent French foothold within their conquest of the Levant following the Siege of El Arish. After the city fell to the French troops, Napoleon had Abdallah Bey executed alongside several thousand Muslim prisoners of war, reportedly in retaliation for the brutal killing and death of Napoleon's messengers to the city, who were tortured, castrated and decapitated, with their heads impaled on the city walls ahead of the battle by the Ottomans.
