= Deux Frères (1798 ship) =

Deux Frères was a tartane that the French Navy requisitioned in March 1798 at Marseille and commissioned as a transport. A British division under the command of Commodore Sir Sidney Smith in Tigre captured her on 18 March 1799 at the siege of Acre in 1799. She was one of a flotilla of seven vessels and Smith took all into the Royal Navy.

At the time of her capture Deux Frères was armed with four guns and had a crew of 23 men. One of the seven captured vessels was lost in a gale at the siege; the lost vessel was almost certainly Deux Frères, as the other six have a readily identifiable subsequent history.

== See also ==
- List of gun-vessels Commodore Sir Sidney Smith captured at Acre in March 1799
