= Canton of Blain =

Coordinates: 47.48°N 1.76°W

The canton of Blain is an administrative division of the Loire-Atlantique department, western France. Its borders were modified at the French canton reorganisation which came into effect in March 2015. Its seat is in Blain.

It consists of the following communes:

1. Blain
2. Bouée
3. Bouvron
4. Campbon
5. La Chapelle-Launay
6. Cordemais
7. Le Gâvre
8. Lavau-sur-Loire
9. Malville
10. Prinquiau
11. Quilly
12. Saint-Étienne-de-Montluc
13. Savenay
14. Le Temple-de-Bretagne
