= Saint-Étienne-de-Montluc =

- Commune
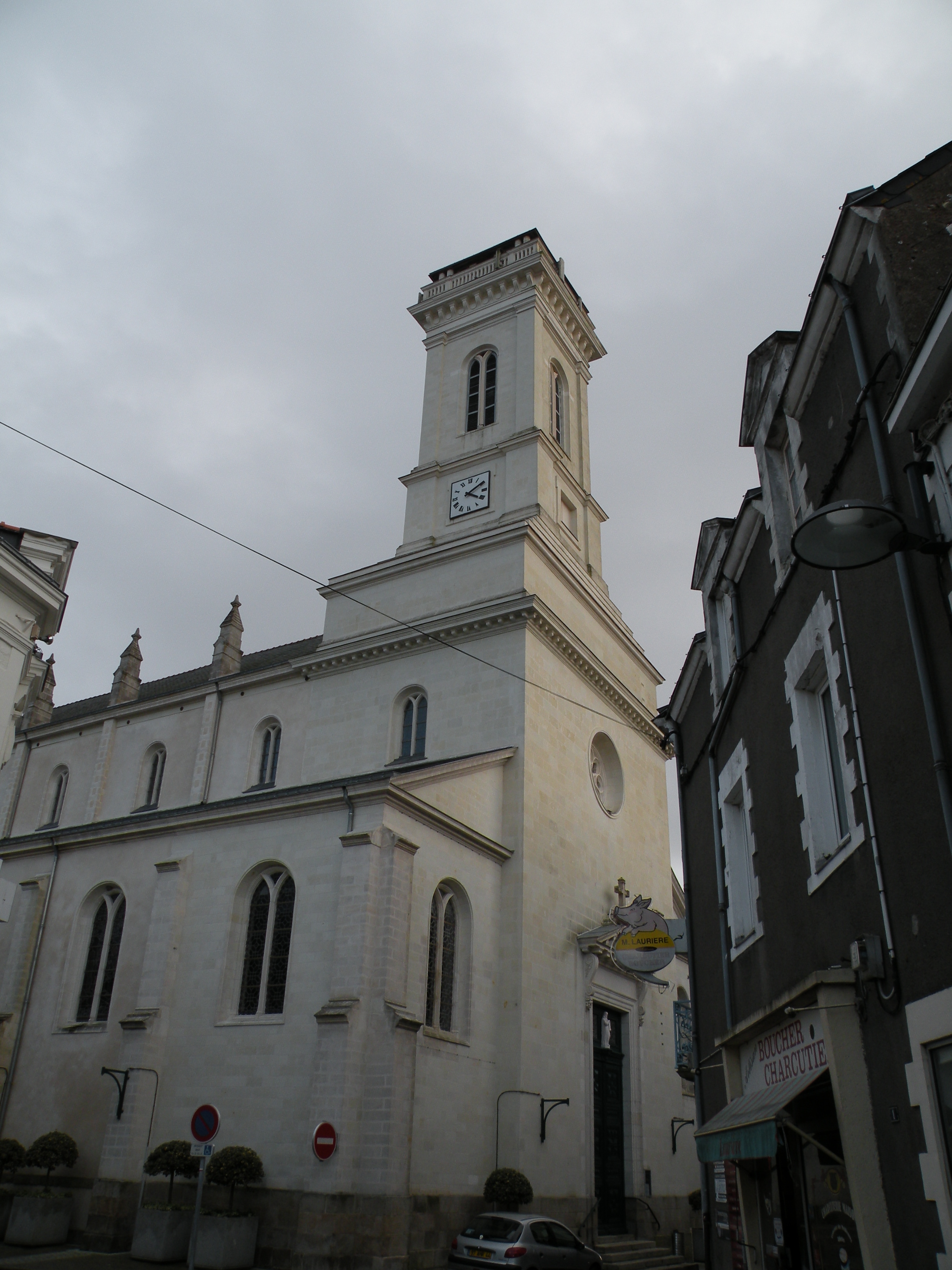

- Coat of arms
- Location of Saint-Étienne-de-Montluc
- Location within France Location within Pays de la Loire
- Coordinates: 47°16′38″N 1°46′45″W
- Country: France
- Region: Pays de la Loire
- Department: Loire-Atlantique
- Arrondissement: Nantes
- Canton: Blain
- Intercommunality: Estuaire et Sillon

Government
  - Mayor (2020–2026): Rémy Nicoleau
- Area^{1}: 57.57 km^{2} (22.23 sq mi)
- Elevation: 17 m (56 ft)
- Highest elevation: 89 m (292 ft)
- Lowest elevation: 0 m (0 ft)
- Population (2023): 7,780
  - Density: 135/km^{2} (350/sq mi)
- Time zone: UTC+01:00 (CET)
  - Summer (DST): UTC+02:00 (CEST)
- INSEE/Postal code: 44158 /44360
- ^{1} French Land Register data, which excludes lakes, ponds, glaciers > 1 km^{2} (0.386 sq mi or 247 acres) and river estuaries.

Saint-Étienne-de-Montluc (French pronunciation: [sɛ̃.t‿etjɛn də mɔ̃lyk]; Breton: Sant-Stefan-Brengoloù) is a commune in the Loire-Atlantique department in western France.

== Population ==
Historical population

Year	Pop.	±% p.a.
1793	4,293	—
1800	4,118	−0.59%
1806	4,354	+0.93%
1821	4,388	+0.05%
1831	4,348	−0.09%
1841	4,540	+0.43%
1846	4,714	+0.76%
1851	4,778	+0.27%
1856	4,723	−0.23%
1861	4,783	+0.25%
1866	4,874	+0.38%
1872	4,760	−0.39%
1876	4,739	−0.11%
1881	4,516	−0.96%
1886	4,417	−0.44%
1891	4,322	−0.43%
1896	4,314	−0.04%
1901	4,174	−0.66%

Year	Pop.	±% p.a.
1906	4,170	−0.02%
1911	4,218	+0.23%
1921	3,756	−1.15%
1926	3,748	−0.04%
1931	3,658	−0.48%
1936	3,629	−0.16%
1946	3,852	+0.60%
1954	3,712	−0.46%
1962	3,520	−0.66%
1968	3,595	+0.35%
1975	3,900	+1.17%
1982	5,018	+3.67%
1990	5,759	+1.74%
1999	6,231	+0.88%
2007	6,613	+0.75%
2012	6,635	+0.07%
2017	7,129	+1.45%
2023	7,780	+1.47%

Source: EHESS and INSEE (1968-2023)

== See also ==
- Communes of the Loire-Atlantique department
