= Jacques Louis François Delaistre de Tilly =

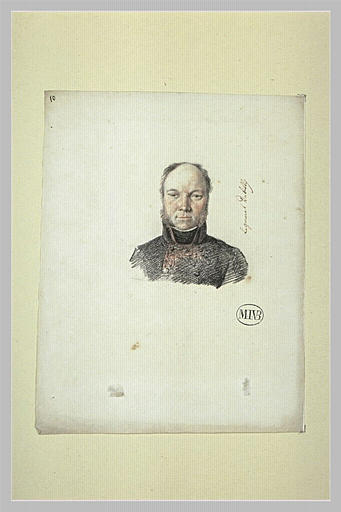
- Jacques Louis François Delaistre de Tilly
- Born: 2 February 1749; Vernon, Eure, France
- Died: 10 January 1822 (aged 72) Paris, France
- Allegiance: France
- Branch: Cavalry
- Rank: General of Division
- Conflicts: French Revolutionary Wars; Battle of Savenay; Napoleonic Wars; Battle of Haslach-Jungingen; Battle of Elchingen; Battle of Lübeck; Battle of Vitoria
- Awards: Baron d'Empire (1812)

Jacques-Louis-François Delaistre de Tilly (French pronunciation: [ʒak lwi fʁɑ̃swa dəlɛstʁ də tili]; 2 February 1749, Vernon, Eure – 10 January 1822, Paris) became a general officer in the French army during the French Revolutionary Wars. He led a cavalry division in a number of battles during the Napoleonic Wars. His name is inscribed under the Arc de Triomphe.

== Service ==
- 29 November 1792 : Colonel of the 6th Regiment of Dragoons
- 21 April 1793 : General of Brigade
- 2 December 1793 : General of Division
- 23 December 1793 : Commanded troops at the Battle of Savenay
- 5 May 1801 : Commander in chief of the Armée de l'Ouest
- 11 October 1805 : Commanded the Cavalry Division of the VI Corps at the Battle of Haslach-Jungingen
- 14 October 1805 : Commanded the Cavalry Division of the VI Corps at the Battle of Elchingen
- 17 October 1806 : Commanded the Cavalry Division of the I Corps at the Battle of Schleiz
- 17 October 1806 : Commanded the Cavalry Division of the I Corps at the Battle of Halle
- 6 November 1806 : Commanded the Cavalry Division of the I Corps at the Battle of Lübeck
- 25 January 1807 : Commanded the Cavalry Division of the I Corps at the Battle of Mohrungen
- 21 June 1813 : Commanded the 2nd Cavalry Division of the Army of the South at the Battle of Vitoria

== Decorations ==
- 25 March 1809 : Chevalier d'Empire
- 23 April 1812 : Baron d'Empire

== Honours ==
- TILLY is engraved on Column 4 of the Arc de Triomphe
