= Antoine Le Picard de Phélippeaux =

French-born army officer

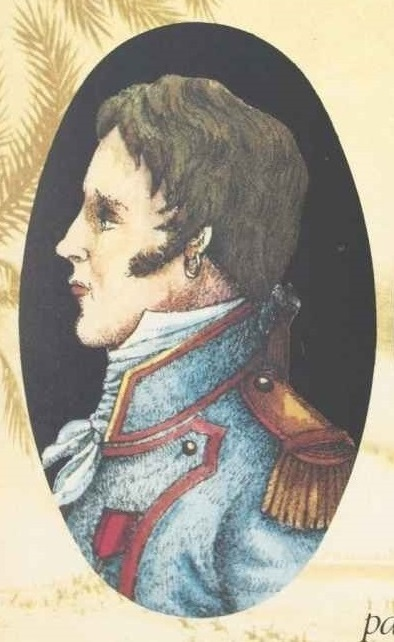
- Portrait of Phélippeaux
- Born: 1 April 1767; Angles-sur-l'Anglin
- Died: 1799 (aged 31–32); Acre, Ottoman Empire
- Military career
- Allegiance: Kingdom of France; Army of Condé; Great Britain
- Service years: 1785–1799
- Rank: Colonel

Colonel Louis-Edmond Antoine le Picard de Phélippeaux (French pronunciation: [felipo]; 1 April 1767 – 1 May 1799) was a French-born army officer best known for resisting the French invasion of Egypt and Syria. In 1783, Phélippeaux met Napoleon at the École Militaire in Paris where the two young men became lifelong enemies. During the French Revolution, Phélippeaux remained loyal to the ancien régime and fled to England in 1791. He joined the Army of Condé and fought against the French First Republic. After rescuing Sidney Smith from a Paris prison, Phélippeaux was made a British colonel thanks to Smith's influence and joined him in resisting the French invasion of Syria. Fighting against Napoleon in the siege of Acre, Phélippeaux died from fever in May 1799.

== Early life ==
Louis-Edmond Antoine le Picard de Phélippeaux was born on April 1, 1767, in Angles-sur-l'Anglin, Vienne. His mother was Louise de La Châtre (1738–1767), and his father, Louis le Picard de Phélippeaux (1727–1776), was an officer and a monarchist.

At 16 years old, Antoine de Phélippeaux attended the École Militaire in Paris where he met Napoleon Bonaparte, two years his younger. Napoleon disliked Phélippeaux due to jealousy of his superb performance in class. At one point during training, a sergeant major Picot de Peccaduc was forced to get between the two quarrelers, but he was kicked in the process. At the École Militaire, the two were taught the same warfare strategies.

Both Napoleon and Phélippeaux obtained a commission after examination on September 1, 1785; Phélippeaux listed forty-first and Napoleon listed forty-second. After obtaining his commission of Second Lieutenant, Phélippeaux was sent to the artillery regiment of Besançon.

== Enemy of the French Republic ==
In 1789, Louis-Edmond Antoine le Picard de Phélippeaux was promoted to Captain of the Besançon Regiment. Two years later, he resigned and emigrated from France to Great Britain, presumably to escape from the French Revolution, being a monarchist like his father. For four years, he served in the Army of Condé against the French Republic.

In 1795, he returned to France to help organize a royalist insurrection in Berry. However, Phélippeaux was arrested by general Simon Canuel, and the plan failed. He was imprisoned in Bourges but escaped on the eve of his execution with the help of a relative. Unscathed, he secretly resumed counter-revolutionary activities outside of Paris.

Two years later, in 1797, Antoine de Phélippeaux returned to Paris in order to free British naval officer Sir William Sidney Smith from Temple prison. At the same time, he planned to rescue three royalists and two people that had aided in his escape. The elaborate plan included the construction of a tunnel from a nearby house to the prison, and involved the help of a mason to chip away at bricks and a seven-year-old girl to serve as a decoy. Nevertheless, the plot failed and Phélippeaux had to reorganize.

This time, in order to communicate with the prisoners, he seduced the jailer's daughter. Phélippeaux procured false papers and presented himself at Temple prison as a police commissioner. After presenting a forged order, Smith and the others were released and left quickly by carriage. Notwithstanding, the carriage turned a sharp corner, injuring a child and causing a crowd to gather around the overturned carriage. Despite that, Phélippeaux forced himself and the escapees through the crowd. The authorities were notified of Smith's absence just as Phélippeaux, Williams, and others fled Paris.

The group slept in a safe house in the rue de l'Université, and the next morning Phélippeaux led their path to the coast. Once they had arrived in Rouen, they prepared forged passports at a royalist's house. Upon completion, the group dressed in sailor clothes and traveled to Honfleur. Phélippeaux chartered a small fishing boat, and once they were in the British Channel, the group boarded a British ship.

On May 7, 1798, they landed in Portsmouth and arrived in London by the next morning. Phélippeaux soon become a hero after Smith told others about his daring rescuer.

== Expedition in Egypt ==
Sir Sidney Smith's influence gained Phélippeaux a British colonelcy; Smith was now accredited to the Ottoman Empire as an Envoy Plenipotentiary and commanded of a squadron off the coast of Egypt and Syria. In 1799, Phélippeaux accompanied Smith on his diplomatic mission to Constantinople; this led to Acre, where Phélippeaux was presented to Jezzar Paşa. Phélippeaux's new mission was to help Jezzar with the defence of Acre.

Phélippeaux inspected the medieval walls and bastions and noticed them crumbling. Acre also had very few cannons facing the sea. He convinced Jezzar of the dangers, and gangs of labourers were placed in Phélippeaux's hands. He began to strengthen the walls, mount guns, construct trenches, and excavate the moat. The trenches he constructed were behind the old fortifications, creating a double barrier. Following Smith's capture of Napoleon's artillery, Phélippeaux was able to install the guns in the fortress.

Phélippeaux's efforts enabled the defence to defeat Napoleon Bonaparte in the battle of Acre.

== Death and legacy ==
Phélippeaux died in 1799, not long after his victory in the battle in Acre, either of exhaustion or the plague. Sir William Sidney Smith wrote of Phélippeaux's death, “Col. Phélippeaux, the engineer, has fallen as a sacrifice for this service; want of rest and exposure to the sun having given him a fever of which he has died.”

While Napoleon was exiled on St. Helena, he recollected that Phélippeaux had a tremendous impact on his life. “Without him, I would have had taken the Key to the Orient, I would have marched on Constantinople, I would have rebuilt the throne of the Orient.”
