= The Count of Chanteleine =

Short story by Jules Verne

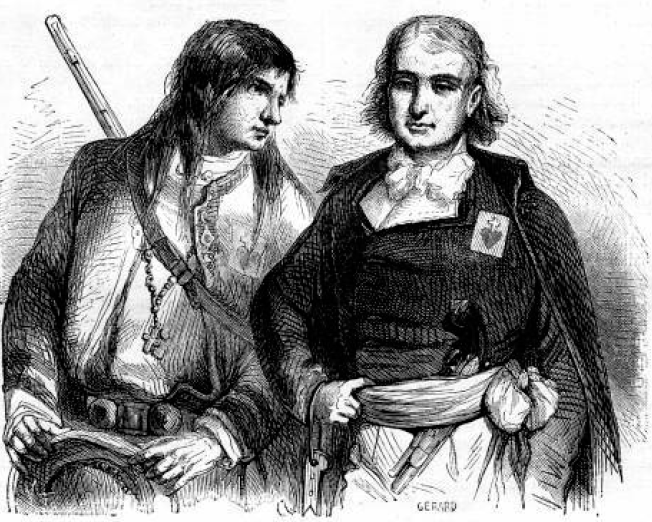
Verne - Le Comte de Chanteleine

"The Count of Chanteleine" (French Le Comte de Chanteleine), also known as The Count of Chanteleine: A Tale of the French Revolution, is a short story by Jules Verne published in 1864.

== Plot ==
The story is about a nobleman whose wife is murdered during the French Revolution and his fight to save his daughter.
