= Bouée =

Bouée Bóey (Gallo) Bozeg (Breton)
- Commune
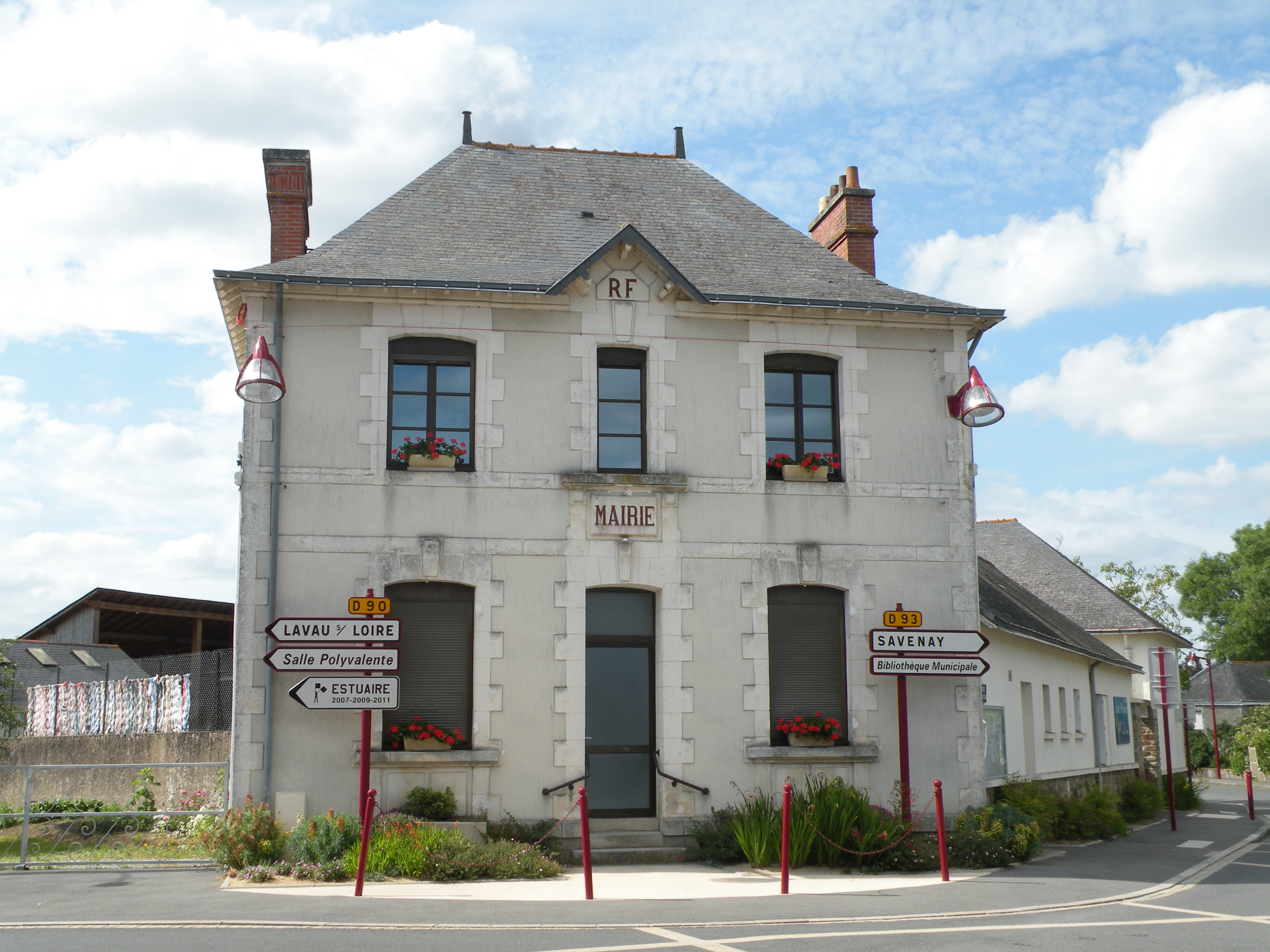
- Town hall
- Location of Bouée
- Location within France Location within Pays de la Loire
- Coordinates: 47°19′18″N 1°54′31″W
- Country: France
- Region: Pays de la Loire
- Department: Loire-Atlantique
- Arrondissement: Saint-Nazaire
- Canton: Blain
- Intercommunality: Estuaire et Sillon

Government
  - Mayor (2020–2026): André Le Borgne
- Area^{1}: 21.34 km^{2} (8.24 sq mi)
- Highest elevation: 28 m (92 ft)
- Lowest elevation: 0 m (0 ft)
- Population (2023): 1,097
  - Density: 51.41/km^{2} (133.1/sq mi)
- Time zone: UTC+01:00 (CET)
  - Summer (DST): UTC+02:00 (CEST)
- INSEE/Postal code: 44019 /44260
- ^{1} French Land Register data, which excludes lakes, ponds, glaciers > 1 km^{2} (0.386 sq mi or 247 acres) and river estuaries.

Bouée (French pronunciation: [bwe]; Gallo: Bóey, Breton: Bozeg) is a commune in the Loire-Atlantique department in western France.

== Population ==
Historical population
| Year | Pop. | ±% p.a. |
|---|---|---|
| 1968 | 455 | — |
| 1975 | 435 | −0.64% |
| 1982 | 571 | +3.96% |
| 1990 | 618 | +0.99% |
| 1999 | 661 | +0.75% |
| 2007 | 812 | +2.61% |
| 2012 | 892 | +1.90% |
| 2017 | 991 | +2.13% |
| 2023 | 1,097 | +1.71% |
Source: INSEE

== See also ==
- Communes of the Loire-Atlantique department
