= Malville =

Malville Malvile (Gallo) Kerwall (Breton)
- Commune
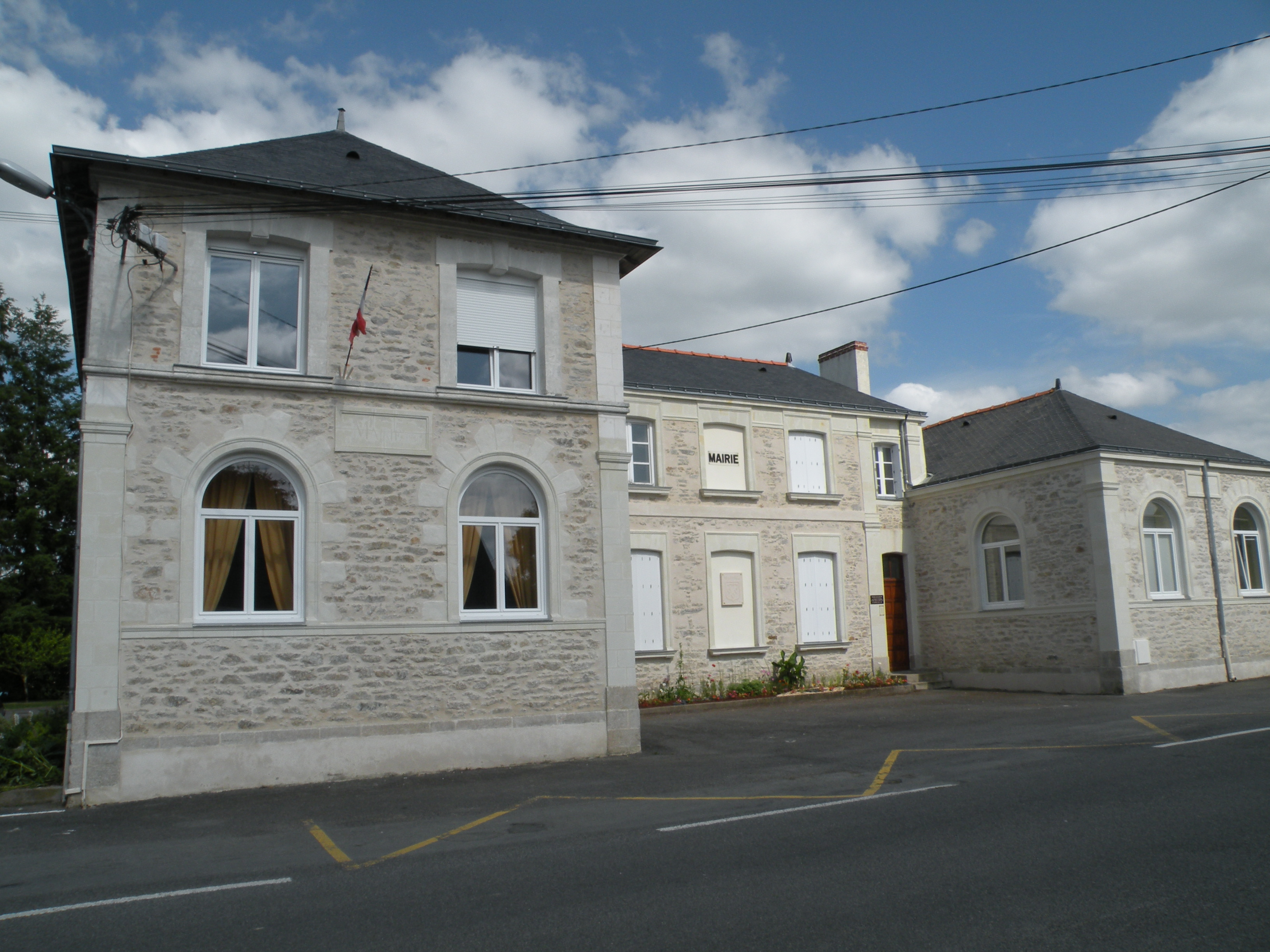
- Town hall

- Coat of arms
- Location of Malville
- Location within France Location within Pays de la Loire
- Coordinates: 47°21′42″N 1°51′45″W
- Country: France
- Region: Pays de la Loire
- Department: Loire-Atlantique
- Arrondissement: Saint-Nazaire
- Canton: Blain
- Intercommunality: Estuaire et Sillon

Government
  - Mayor (2020–2026): Martine Lejeune
- Area^{1}: 31.24 km^{2} (12.06 sq mi)
- Highest elevation: 89 m (292 ft)
- Lowest elevation: 1 m (3.3 ft)
- Population (2023): 3,752
  - Density: 120.1/km^{2} (311.1/sq mi)
- Time zone: UTC+01:00 (CET)
  - Summer (DST): UTC+02:00 (CEST)
- INSEE/Postal code: 44089 /44260
- ^{1} French Land Register data, which excludes lakes, ponds, glaciers > 1 km^{2} (0.386 sq mi or 247 acres) and river estuaries.

Malville (French pronunciation: [malvil]; Gallo: Malvile, Breton: Kerwall) is a commune in the Loire-Atlantique department in western France.

== Population ==
Historical population

Year	Pop.	±% p.a.
1793	1,016	—
1821	1,160	+0.47%
1846	1,493	+1.01%
1872	1,652	+0.39%
1901	1,587	−0.14%
1926	1,265	−0.90%
1946	977	−1.28%
1962	887	−0.60%
1968	842	−0.86%

Year	Pop.	±% p.a.
1975	1,020	+2.78%
1982	2,085	+10.75%
1990	2,860	+4.03%
1999	2,980	+0.46%
2007	3,076	+0.40%
2012	3,252	+1.12%
2017	3,463	+1.27%
2023	3,752	+1.34%

Source: EHESS and INSEE (1968-2023)

== See also ==
- Communes of the Loire-Atlantique department
