= Siege of Jaffa =

1799 siege during the French invasion of Egypt and Syria

- Part of the French invasion of Egypt and Syria during the War of the Second Coalition
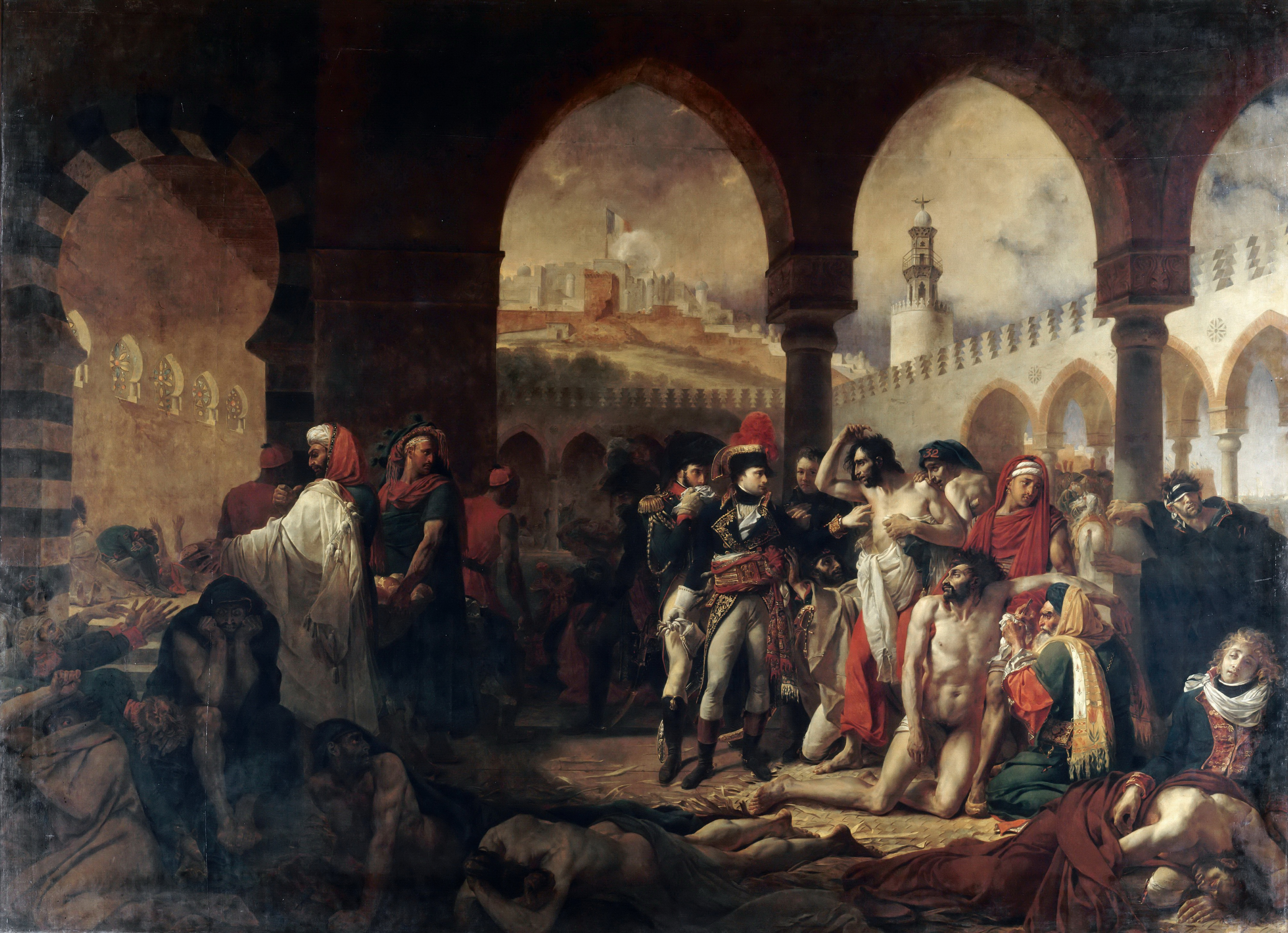
- 1804 painting of Napoleon visiting plague victims in Jaffa four days after the siege
Date	3–7 March 1799
Location	Jaffa, Ottoman Syria 32.0453°N 34.7697°E
Result	French victory

Belligerents
(French First Republic) French Republic	Ottoman Empire

Commanders and leaders
(French First Republic) Napoleon Bonaparte (French First Republic) Jean-Baptiste Kléber	(Ottoman Empire) Ahmed al-Jazzar (Ottoman Empire) Abdallah Bey (executed)

Strength
10,000	5,000 mostly Albanian troops

Casualties and losses
50 killed 200 wounded	2,000 killed 2,100 prisoners executed
- Location within Mediterranean Siege of Jaffa (Earth)

War of the Second Coalition:
Egypt and Syria
current battle
Napoleon in command till 23 August 1799

The siege of Jaffa was a military engagement between the French Army under Napoleon Bonaparte and Ottoman forces under Ahmed al-Jazzar. On March 3, 1799, the French laid siege to the city of Jaffa, which was under Ottoman control. It was fought from March 3 to 7, when French forces managed to capture the city. For the pillaging of the city, the murder of its civilian population and the execution of 4,100 Ottoman prisoners of war, the siege has been called "one of the most tragic episodes of [Napoleon's] Egyptian campaign".

== Background ==
Having taken control of Alexandria and Cairo and losing control of the territories under Cairo, despite having his ships destroyed, Napoleon Bonaparte was continuing his push on the Ottoman territories in the Middle East. Having captured an Ottoman fortress at El Arish just weeks earlier (February 17–20), he was looking to cement his foothold in the Levant. In early March, his troops reached Jaffa (modern Tel Aviv-Jaffa). Napoleon had to win Jaffa before he could advance any further, and the whole expedition's success depended on its capture. The city was one of Greater Syria's main mercantile centres and had a harbour that would provide vital shelter for the French fleet.

== Siege ==
The fortress of the city of Jaffa was surrounded by 12-foot walls, and extensive fortifications constructed by the Ottomans. Ahmed al-Jazzar entrusted its defence to his troops, including 1,200 artillerymen. All of the exterior works could be besieged, and a breach was feasible. The siege began March 3 at noon and continued to March 7, when Bonaparte sent an officer and a trumpeter to Ahmed al-Jazzar, with a message calling on him to surrender: "he [Bonaparte] is moved by the evil that will befall the city if it subjects itself to this assault". In reply, Ahmed decapitated the messengers, displayed the head of one on the city walls and ordered a sortie. The sortie was pushed back as early as the evening of the same day. The French managed to destroy one of the towers on the city fortifications, and despite resistance by its defenders, Jaffa was taken.

The murder of the French messengers led Napoleon, when the city fell, to allow his soldiers two days and two nights of slaughter, pillage and rape. It was a scene that Bonaparte himself described as "all the horrors of war, which never appeared to me so hideous." He also executed the Ottoman governor, Abdallah Bey.

Having taken the city, Bonaparte found himself with thousands of prisoners whose fate he had to decide. Not wishing to take on the burden of feeding the prisoners and fearing that if allowed to live they would simply rejoin the Ottoman army, Bonaparte no longer wished to honour the promises of his stepson Eugène de Beauharnais for prisoners' lives to be spared. Instead, he ordered that just 20 Ottoman officers would not be executed; the rest of the prisoners (according to some sources around 2,440, according to other sources 4,100), most of them Albanians, were to be taken to the seashore south of Jaffa and shot or stabbed to death with bayonets. It took three days to accomplish that task.

The moral and legal justification or the lack of it for Bonaparte's decision to execute the Ottoman prisoners has been a matter of strong debate. In their writings and memoirs, his officers' views ranged from reluctant approval to abhorrence. The most influential writing on the law of war at the time was Emer de Vattel's widely discussed treatise, The Laws of Nations (1758). In it, de Vattel (1714–1767) laid out the considerations involved in the sparing or executing soldiers of a defeated army: "When one has such a large army of prisoners that it is impossible to feed them, or to guard them securely, does one have the right to put them to death, or must one send them back, at the risk of being overwhelmed by them on another occasion?" Vattel went on to say that prisoners of war should be paroled and sent back to their country of origin.

Bonaparte had recent experience with that approach. Following his army's recent victory over Ottoman troops at El-Arrish, he had released prisoners taken in battle under the promise that they return to Damascus and not rejoin the pasha's forces in Jaffa or Acre, his two military objectives. Despite their assurances, the prisoners rejoined the pasha's army, as proved by the fact that many of the prisoners taken at Jaffa were recognized by the French as having been among those who had been pardoned in the earlier battle. The main reason that Bonaparte's defenders raise to justify executing the prisoners is that it would have put his troops at great risk: Bonaparte did not have sufficient troops to spare to escort the prisoners out of the war zone without endangering those who remained, the French did not have enough food to feed them; plague was endemic in the region and was spreading among the troops and adding thousands of more people to their ranks would have increased the risk of the disease spreading further. The final motivation that Bonaparte had was that by showing no mercy to the enemy he would strike terror in the ranks of Ahmed al-Jazzar's troops.

== Aftermath ==
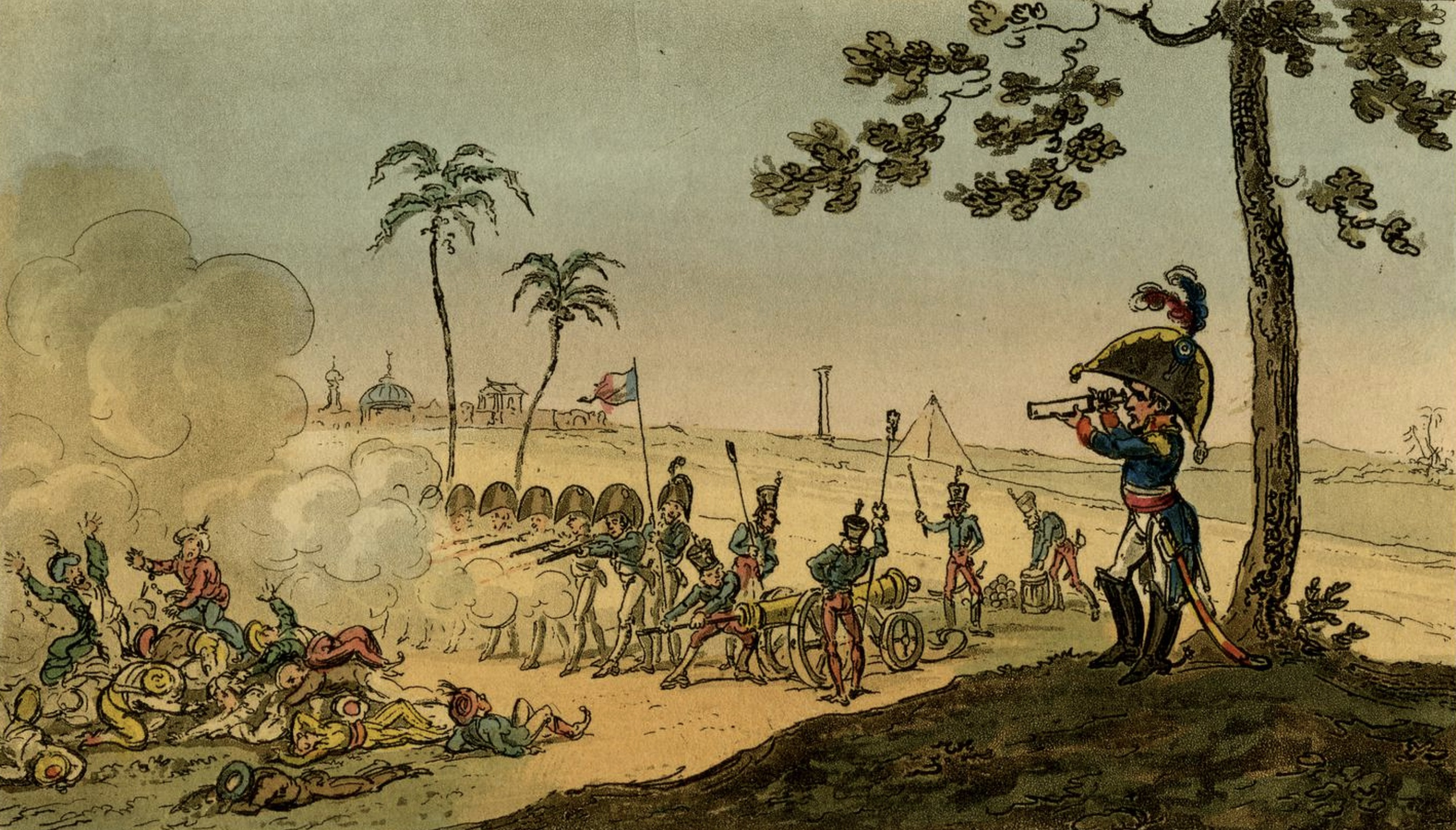
1814 cartoon of the massacre of the Ottoman prisoners

Napoleon allowed hundreds of local citizens to leave the city and hoped that the news they would carry of the sack of Jaffa would intimidate the defenders of the other cities in Syria and cause them to surrender or flee. In fact, it had mixed results and backfired when French troops attacked Acre since the news of the Jaffa massacre made Acre's defenders fight all the more fiercely. Months later, when he attacked Abukir, the French reputation for showing no mercy caused many of the Ottoman soldiers to flee.

Meanwhile, a plague epidemic caused by poor hygiene in the French headquarters in Ramla decimated the local population and the French army alike. Overcome in the north of the country by the Ottomans, Napoleon abandoned Palestine. After his departure, the British, allied to the Ottomans and commanded by William Sidney Smith, rebuilt Jaffa's fortifications.

From 1800 to 1814, after a new nine-month siege, Jaffa was again taken over by Napoleon's former opponent, Ahmed al-Jazzar, Acre's governor.
