= Lavau-sur-Loire =

Lavau-sur-Loire Lavau/Lavao (Gallo) Gwal-Liger (Breton)
- Commune
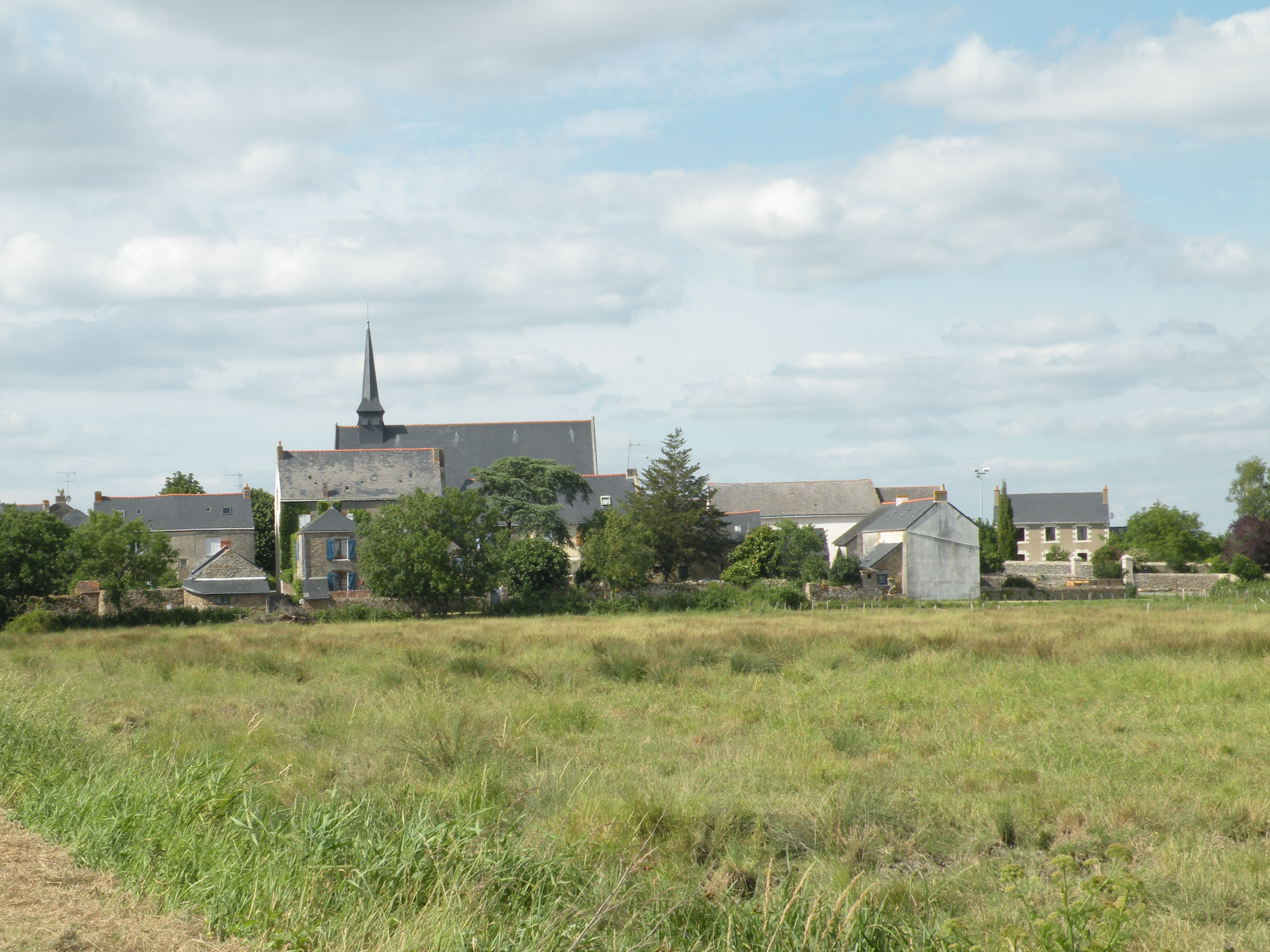
- Location of Lavau-sur-Loire
- Location within France Location within Pays de la Loire
- Coordinates: 47°18′28″N 1°57′55″W
- Country: France
- Region: Pays de la Loire
- Department: Loire-Atlantique
- Arrondissement: Saint-Nazaire
- Canton: Blain
- Intercommunality: Estuaire et Sillon

Government
  - Mayor (2020–2026): Claire Tramier
- Area^{1}: 16.22 km^{2} (6.26 sq mi)
- Highest elevation: 15 m (49 ft)
- Lowest elevation: 0 m (0 ft)
- Population (2023): 773
  - Density: 47.7/km^{2} (123/sq mi)
- Time zone: UTC+01:00 (CET)
  - Summer (DST): UTC+02:00 (CEST)
- INSEE/Postal code: 44080 /44260
- ^{1} French Land Register data, which excludes lakes, ponds, glaciers > 1 km^{2} (0.386 sq mi or 247 acres) and river estuaries.

Lavau-sur-Loire (French pronunciation: [lavo syʁ lwaʁ], literally Lavau on Loire; Gallo: Lavau or Lavao, Breton: Gwal-Liger) is a commune in the Loire-Atlantique department in western France.

== Population ==
Historical population
Year	Pop.	±% p.a.
1968	461	—
1975	442	−0.60%
1982	555	+3.31%
1990	637	+1.74%
1999	614	−0.41%
2007	741	+2.38%
2012	750	+0.24%
2017	767	+0.45%
2023	773	+0.13%
Source: INSEE

== See also ==
- Communes of the Loire-Atlantique department
