= Quilly, Loire-Atlantique =

Quilly
- Commune
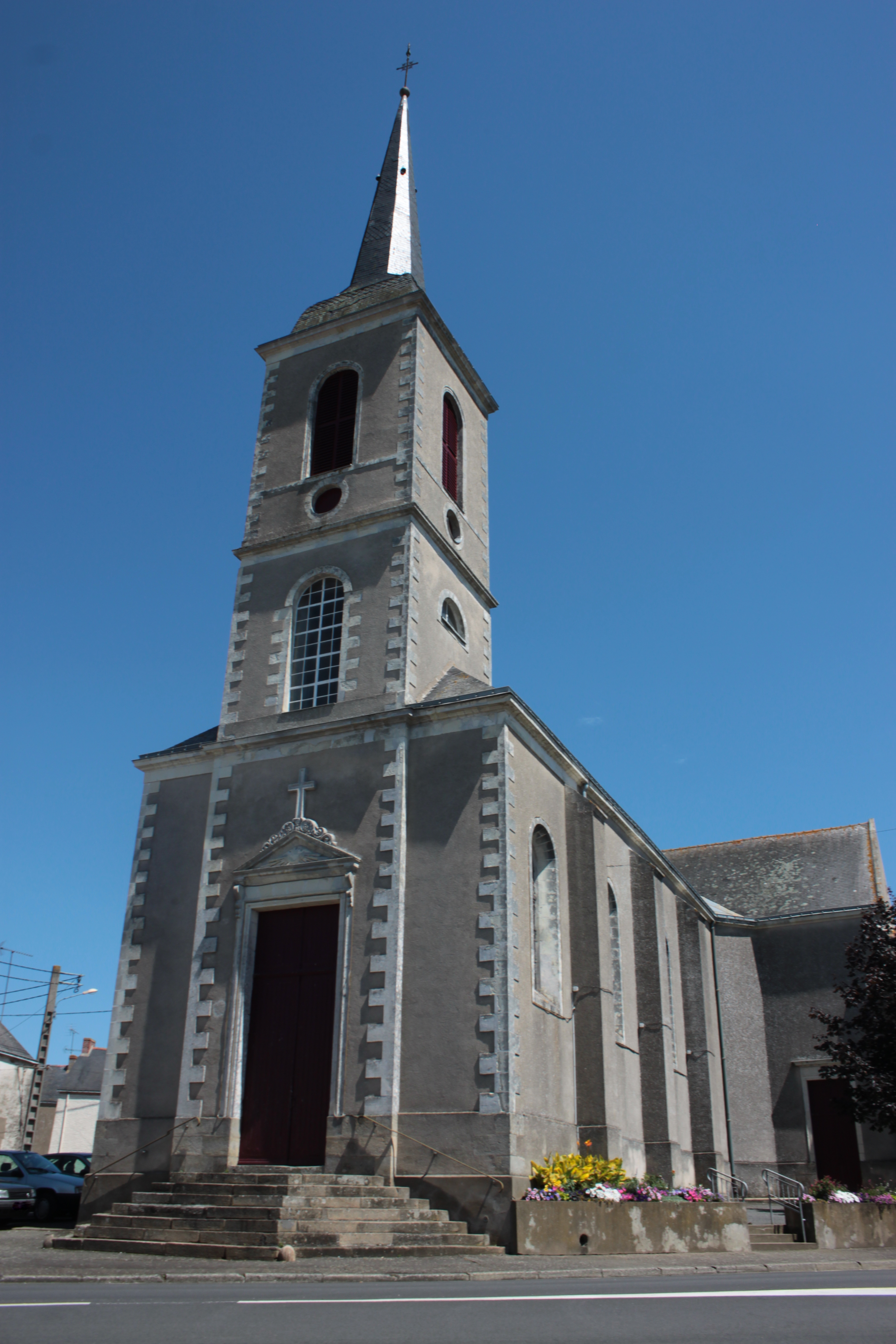

- Coat of arms
- Location of Quilly
- Location within France Location within Pays de la Loire
- Coordinates: 47°27′45″N 1°57′07″W
- Country: France
- Region: Pays de la Loire
- Department: Loire-Atlantique
- Arrondissement: Saint-Nazaire
- Canton: Blain

Government
  - Mayor (2026–32): Charles Caro
- Area^{1}: 17.67 km^{2} (6.82 sq mi)
- Highest elevation: 37 m (121 ft)
- Lowest elevation: 1 m (3.3 ft)
- Population (2023): 1,565
  - Density: 88.57/km^{2} (229.4/sq mi)
- Time zone: UTC+01:00 (CET)
  - Summer (DST): UTC+02:00 (CEST)
- INSEE/Postal code: 44139 /44750
- ^{1} French Land Register data, which excludes lakes, ponds, glaciers > 1 km^{2} (0.386 sq mi or 247 acres) and river estuaries.

Quilly (French pronunciation: [kili]; Gallo: Qili Breton: Killig) is a commune in the Loire-Atlantique department in Brittany in western France.

According to the ofis publik ar brezhoneg, Quilly is "A name derived from the Breton word Killi (‘bosque’). In Old Breton (5th–10th centuries), the word was written as ‘kelli, celli, cilli’. The word also exists in the two Celtic languages closest to Breton, in the forms ‘cilli, celli’ in Welsh and ‘kelli’ in Cornish. The earliest forms of the name, dating from the late 12th century, feature a final -c. This does not appear to be an anachronism, as it still appears in 1571, suggesting the presence of Killi in a diminutive form ending in -ig or perhaps with the altered form of the suffix -eg. Killieg refers to a place with bosques."

The ofis publik ar brezhoneg has chosen to officially rename the city "Killig" ['kilik] in breton for these reasons.

The name of the city in the local gallo language is "Qhili" or "Qili".

== Population ==
Historical population
Year	Pop.	±% p.a.
1968	837	—
1975	781	−0.98%
1982	793	+0.22%
1990	859	+1.00%
1999	905	+0.58%
2007	1,180	+3.37%
2012	1,334	+2.48%
2017	1,380	+0.68%
2023	1,565	+2.12%
Source: INSEE

== See also ==
- Communes of the Loire-Atlantique department
