= Campbon =

Campbon Caunbon (Gallo) Kambon (Breton)
- Commune
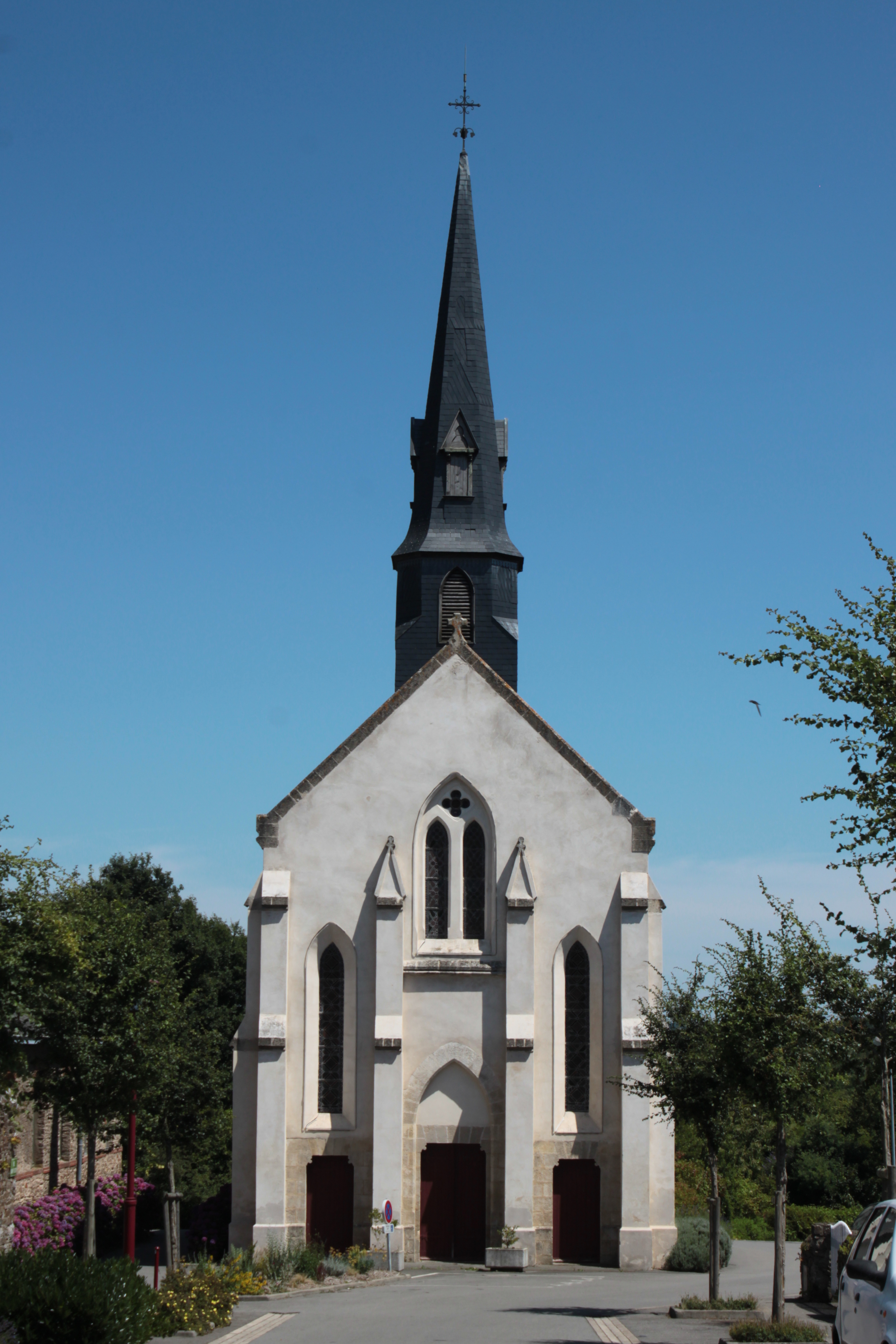

- Coat of arms
- Location of Campbon
- Location within France Location within Pays de la Loire
- Coordinates: 47°24′46″N 1°58′03″W
- Country: France
- Region: Pays de la Loire
- Department: Loire-Atlantique
- Arrondissement: Saint-Nazaire
- Canton: Blain
- Intercommunality: Estuaire et Sillon

Government
  - Mayor (2020–2026): Jean-Louis Thauvin
- Area^{1}: 49.82 km^{2} (19.24 sq mi)
- Highest elevation: 80 m (260 ft)
- Lowest elevation: 3 m (9.8 ft)
- Population (2023): 4,058
  - Density: 81.45/km^{2} (211.0/sq mi)
- Demonym(s): Campbonais, Campbonaises
- Time zone: UTC+01:00 (CET)
  - Summer (DST): UTC+02:00 (CEST)
- INSEE/Postal code: 44025 /44750
- Website: www.campbon.fr
- ^{1} French Land Register data, which excludes lakes, ponds, glaciers > 1 km^{2} (0.386 sq mi or 247 acres) and river estuaries.

Campbon (French pronunciation: [kɑ̃bɔ̃]; Gallo: Caunbon, Breton: Kambon) is a commune in the Loire-Atlantique department in western France.

== Population ==
Historical population

Year	Pop.	±% p.a.
1793	3,479	—
1821	4,024	+0.52%
1846	4,363	+0.32%
1872	4,886	+0.44%
1901	3,525	−1.12%
1926	2,776	−0.95%
1946	2,774	−0.00%
1962	2,650	−0.29%
1968	2,569	−0.52%

Year	Pop.	±% p.a.
1975	2,666	+0.53%
1982	2,747	+0.43%
1990	2,918	+0.76%
1999	2,897	−0.08%
2007	3,507	+2.42%
2012	3,866	+1.97%
2017	3,998	+0.67%
2023	4,058	+0.25%

Source: EHESS and INSEE (1968-2023)

== See also ==
- Communes of the Loire-Atlantique department
