= Prinquiau =

Prinquiau Prevenkel
- Commune
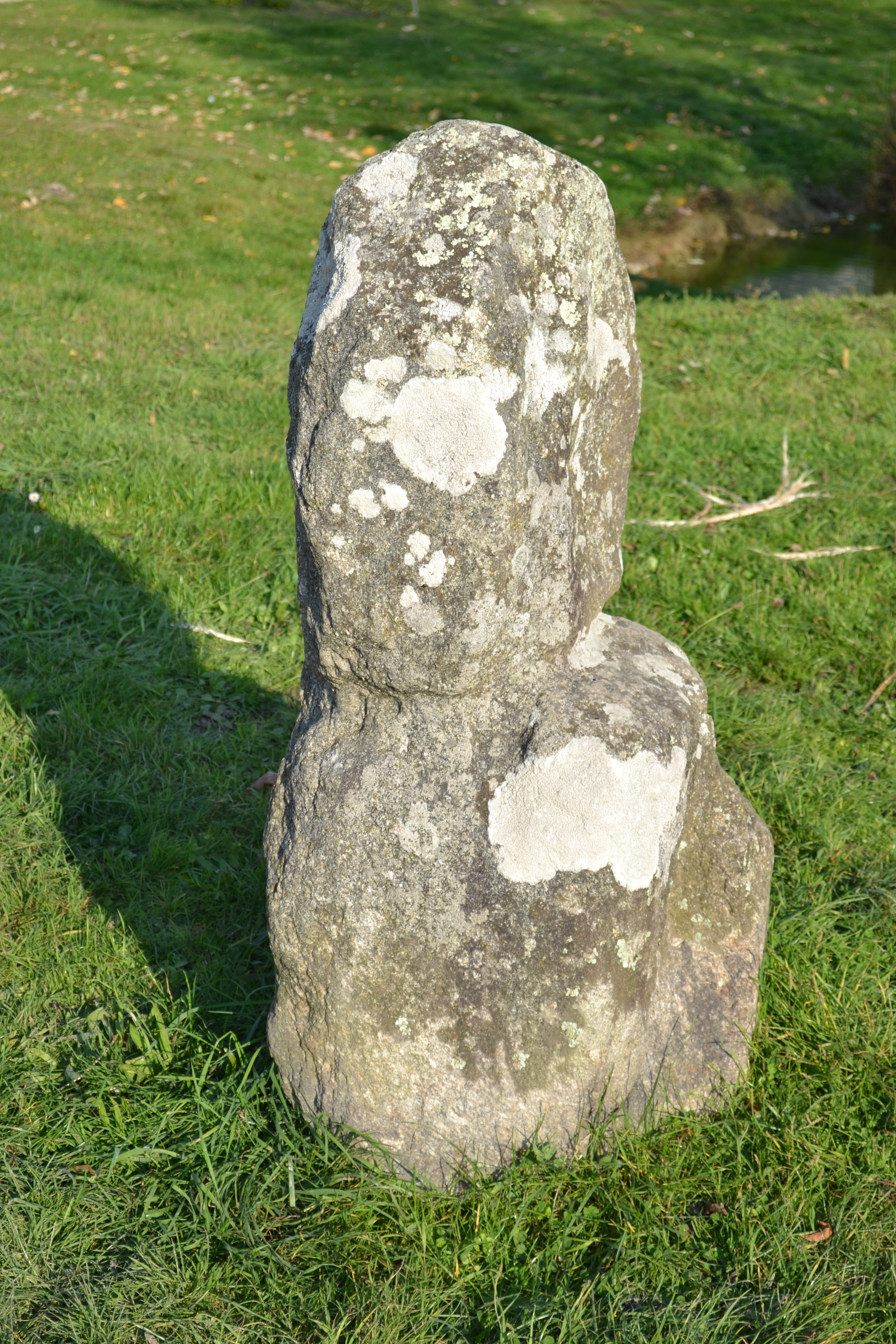
- Mazière menhir

- Coat of arms
- Location of Prinquiau
- Location within France Location within Pays de la Loire
- Coordinates: 47°21′47″N 2°00′36″W
- Country: France
- Region: Pays de la Loire
- Department: Loire-Atlantique
- Arrondissement: Saint-Nazaire
- Canton: Blain
- Intercommunality: Estuaire et Sillon

Government
  - Mayor (2022–2026): Jean-Pierre Blanc
- Area^{1}: 22.82 km^{2} (8.81 sq mi)
- Highest elevation: 70 m (230 ft)
- Lowest elevation: 0 m (0 ft)
- Population (2023): 3,591
  - Density: 157.4/km^{2} (407.6/sq mi)
- Time zone: UTC+01:00 (CET)
  - Summer (DST): UTC+02:00 (CEST)
- INSEE/Postal code: 44137 /44260
- ^{1} French Land Register data, which excludes lakes, ponds, glaciers > 1 km^{2} (0.386 sq mi or 247 acres) and river estuaries.

Prinquiau (French pronunciation: [pʁɛ̃kjo]; Breton: Prevenkel) is a commune in the Loire-Atlantique department in western France.

== Population ==
Historical population

Year	Pop.	±% p.a.
1793	821	—
1821	983	+0.65%
1846	1,298	+1.12%
1872	1,545	+0.67%
1901	1,551	+0.01%
1926	1,237	−0.90%
1946	1,255	+0.07%
1962	1,220	−0.18%
1968	1,214	−0.08%

Year	Pop.	±% p.a.
1975	1,475	+2.82%
1982	2,009	+4.51%
1990	2,175	+1.00%
1999	2,055	−0.63%
2007	2,762	+3.77%
2012	3,289	+3.55%
2017	3,459	+1.01%
2023	3,591	+0.63%

Source: EHESS and INSEE (1968-2023)

== See also ==
- Communes of the Loire-Atlantique department
- Parc naturel régional de Brière
