= Army of the Coasts of Brest =

- Active: 30 April 1793 – 5 January 1796
- Country: (France) French First Republic
- Branch: Army
- Type: Army
- Engagements: War in the Vendée (1793–1796); Chouannerie (1793–1796); Invasion of France (1795)

Commanders
- Notable commanders: Jean Baptiste Camille Canclaux; Jean Antoine Rossignol; Jean-François-Auguste Moulin; Thomas-Alexandre Dumas; Lazare Hoche; Gabriel Venance Rey

The Army of the Coasts of Brest (French: Armée des côtes de Brest) was a French Revolutionary Army formed on 30 April 1793 by splitting the Army of the Coasts into this army and the Army of the Coasts of Cherbourg. The formation was first put under the command of Jean Baptiste Camille Canclaux and charged with fighting the War in the Vendée, combatting the Chouannerie and protecting the coasts of Brittany against a British invasion. After successfully defending Nantes and suffering setbacks at Tiffauges and Montaigu, Canclaux was recalled on 5 October 1793 and many of the army's soldiers were absorbed into the Army of the West. Over the next few years, Jean Antoine Rossignol, Jean-François-Auguste Moulin, Thomas-Alexandre Dumas, Lazare Hoche and Gabriel Venance Rey led the army in turn. In June–July 1795 the army crushed a Royalist invasion at Quiberon. On 5 January 1796 the formation and two other armies were merged into the Army of the Coasts of the Ocean and placed under the command of Hoche.

== Background ==
On 15 December 1792 the French National Convention voted to annex Belgium. Its economic interests threatened, the United Kingdom dismissed the French ambassador on 24 January 1793. France thereupon declared war on Britain and the Dutch Republic on 1 February. Meanwhile, the armies defending France's eastern borders declined in strength from 400,000 to 225,000 soldiers largely due to desertion. To meet the crisis, the Convention decreed mass conscription. Amid these events, King Louis XVI was executed by guillotine on 21 January 1793. The War in the Vendée was triggered by opposition to conscription, annoyance at the high cost of food and fury at the convention's anti-Catholic laws. Protestants and the residents of the large towns generally supported the Republican cause.

The Vendean nobility provided leaders for insurgent fighters who fought in wooded terrain criss-crossed by narrow lanes that were bordered by thick hedges. The Vendean rebels knew every inch of the territory. If the Republican French troops or Blues were defeated they were pursued by a swarm of vengeful Vendean peasants. If the Blues won the fight, the Vendeans vanished into the countryside, lulling their opponents into believing that the war was over. Republicans who prided themselves at having overthrown the monarchy were astonished to find that an entire section of the nation, with few nobles living there, in open Royalist rebellion. Exasperated at the Vendeans, the Republicans finally resorted to brutal means, even extermination, to put down the revolt.

On 31 January 1793 the executive council ordered the formation of the Army of the Coasts under the command of Anne François Augustin de La Bourdonnaye. In March, 34 volunteer and two regular battalions plus two cavalry regiments were assigned to quell the revolt. More reinforcements were withheld due to defeats on the Belgian frontier. While the Republican forces were a motley collection of National Guards, undisciplined volunteers, conscripts and regulars, the Catholic and Royal Army was united in a moral cause. The Vendeans formed themselves into several loosely organized armies, the largest of which was the Army of the Upper Vendée under Jacques Cathelineau, Charles de Bonchamps, Louis Marie de Lescure, Maurice d'Elbée, Jean-Nicolas Stofflet and Henri de la Rochejaquelein and numbering as many as 50,000 men. The Army of the Lower Vendée under the capable François de Charette could muster up to 20,000 rebels in the Breton marshlands and Army of the Center under Charles Aimé de Royrand counted as many as 12,000 insurgents near Les Herbiers in the south.

== History ==
On 14 April 1793, La Bourdonnaye was replaced by Jean Baptiste Camille Canclaux. By decree the Army of the Coasts was split into the Army of the Coasts of Brest and the Army of the Coasts of Cherbourg on 30 April. Canclaux assumed command of the Brest army on 1 May 1793. His army was responsible for the seacoast from Saint-Malo to the mouth of the Loire River.

== Commanders ==
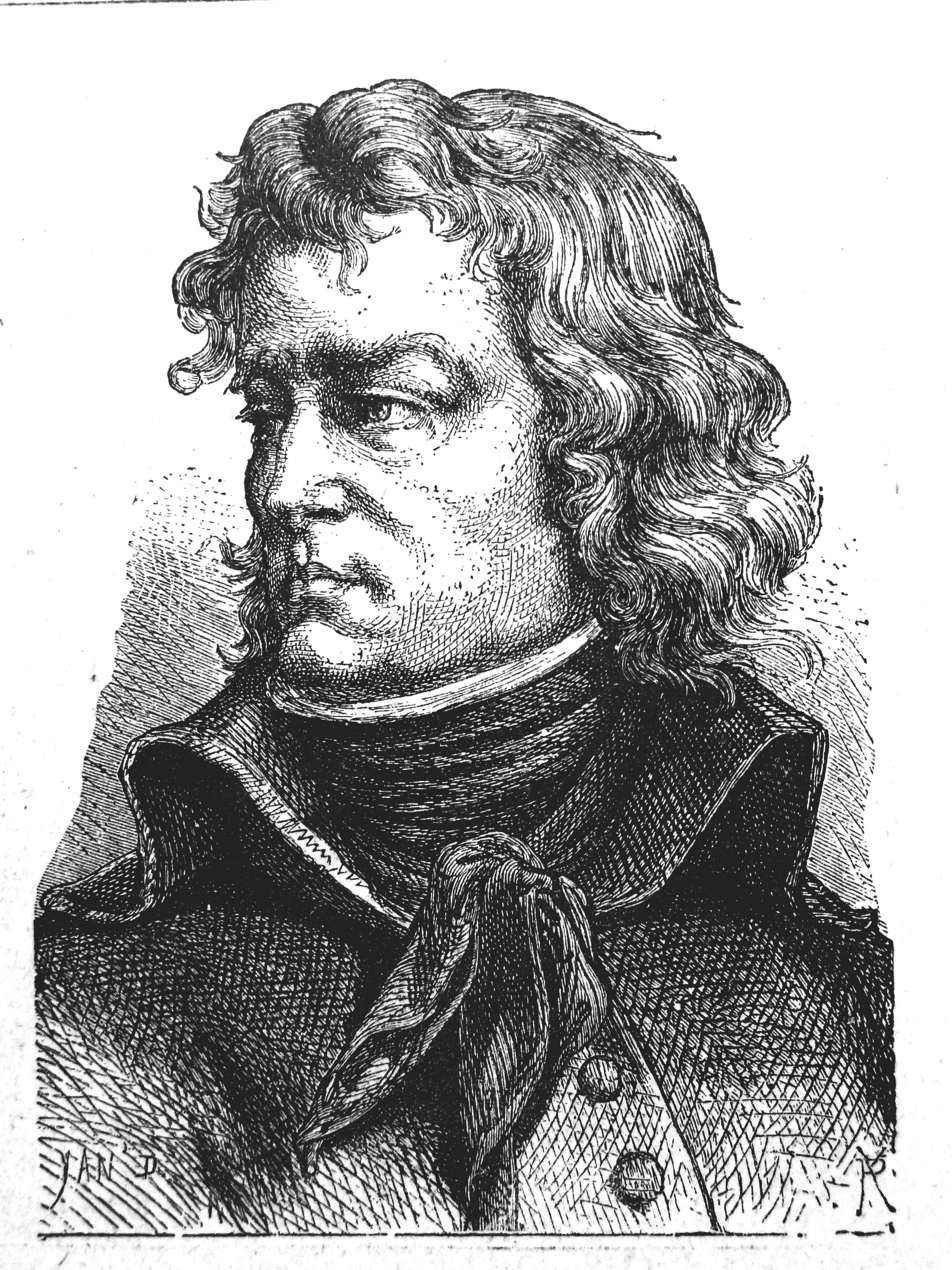
Jean Canclaux

- 1 May – 5 October 1793: Jean Baptiste Camille Canclaux
  - 8 September – 5 October 1793: Jean-Baptiste Annibal Aubert du Bayet led the subordinate Army of Mainz
- 6 October 1793 – 6 May 1794: Jean Antoine Rossignol
- 7 May – 10 October 1794: Jean-François-Auguste Moulin
  - 7 May – 25 August 1794: Martial Vachot led the subordinate Army against the Chouans
- 11 – 23 October 1794: Jean Rivaud (interim)
- 24 October – 9 November 1794: Thomas-Alexandre Dumas
- 10 November 1794 – 9 September 1795: Lazare Hoche
- 10 September – 23 December 1795: Gabriel Venance Rey
- 24 December 1795 – 8 January 1796: Gabriel Marie Joseph, comte d'Hédouville
