= Petiet =

Petiet may refer to:

- Auguste-Louis Petiet (1772–1858), French brigadier general and politician
- Claude Louis Petiet (1749–1806), French politician
- Jules Petiet (1813–1871), French mechanical engineer
- Paul Petiet (1770–1849), French adjutant-general during the Napoleonic Wars
