= Army of the Interior =

French revolutionary field army

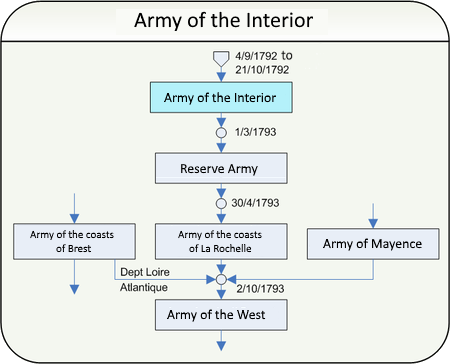

The Army of the Interior (Armée de l'Intérieur) was a name given to two field armies of the French Revolutionary Army.

== 1792 ==
The first formation of this name was initially formed on 4 September 1792 under Anne François Augustin de La Bourdonnaye within the Army of the North and the Army of the Centre - he held its command until 22 September that year. It was reorganised on 21 October 1792 to assist the 'camp sous Paris', suppressed the day before, and given général Berruyer as its new commander. It became the armée de Réserve on 1 March 1793 (when command of its right wing retained by Berruyer and command of its subordinate left wing given to général Beaufranchet d'Ayat) then the armée des côtes de la Rochelle on 30 April the same year, whilst retaining the same organisation and commanders - général Leigonyer and d'Ayat commanded its right and left wings respectively from 29 April to 27 May as interim commanders. Armand Louis de Gontaut-Biron commanded the unit from 28 May until 16 July 1793. It then had no commander until Jean Antoine Rossignol's appointment on 31 July - for those two weeks général Pilotte commanded its right division and Alexis Chalbos its left division.

Rossignol held command for the rest of the unit's existence, barring 25 to 30 August 1793, when he was temporarily replaced by Antoine Joseph Santerre. On 2 October 1793 the French Convention decreed the merger of the army of Mayence with the part of the armée des côtes de la Rochelle operating in the Loire-Inférieure department - this new formation was named the Army of the West.

== 1795-1796 ==
The second formation of this name was raised on 12 July 1795 using the forces of the 17th military division of Paris, augmented by those of the Somme, Seine-Maritime and Eure departments. Its main purpose was to keep order in Paris and its region. Its first commander was Jacques-François Menou, previously commander of the 17th Division. It was ordered to gather in a camp just outside Paris by the French Convention on 24 July.

Menou was replaced as commander on 5 October the same year by Paul Barras, with Napoleon Bonaparte as his second in command - on that date it put down the Royalist insurrection of 13 Vendémiaire. The formation was also used to suppress the revolt in the Grenelle camp and supported the French Directory during its Coup of 18 Fructidor. Bonaparte took over its command from Barras on 26 October 1795, holding it until he was put in command of the Army of Italy on 2 March 1796. Bonaparte still remained in command of the Army of the Interior for a few more days and the Directory were unable to replace him until he departed for his new command on 10 March - his replacement was Jacques Maurice Hatry. It was disbanded by decree of 25 August 1796, effective on 22 September.
