= Jean Baptiste Camille Canclaux =

French army commander

Jean Baptiste Camille de Canclaux
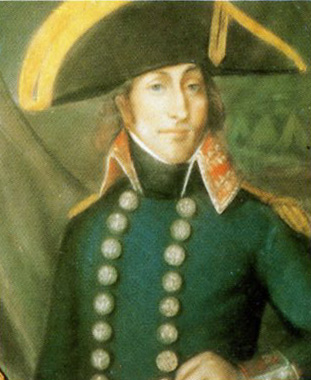
- Born: 2 August 1740; Paris
- Died: 27 December 1817 (aged 77) Paris
- Allegiance: Kingdom of France; Kingdom of the French; French First Republic; First French Empire; Kingdom of France
- Service years: 1756–1800
- Rank: General of Division
- Commands: Army of the Coasts of Brest; Army of the West; Army of the Reserve, Second Line
- Conflicts: Seven Years' War; French Revolutionary Wars; War in the Vendée; Battle of Nantes; Battle of Tiffauges; Battle of Montaigu; Invasion of France; Chouannerie
- Awards: Knight of Saint-Louis, 1773
- Other work: Ministre plénipotentiaire to the court of Naples, 1796–1797; Senator, 1800–1814; Count of the Empire, 1808; Peer of France, 1815

Jean Baptiste Camille de Canclaux (French pronunciation: [ʒɑ̃ batist kamij də kɑ̃klo]; 2 August 1740, in Paris – 27 December 1817, in Paris) was a French army commander during the French Revolution and a Peer of France. He joined a cavalry regiment the French Royal Army in 1756 and fought at Minden in the Seven Years' War. He attained the rank of maréchal de camp (brigadier general) in 1788 and lieutenant general in 1792. He commanded the Army of the Coasts of Brest from May until October 1793 fighting several actions during the War in the Vendée. Replaced for political reasons, he led the Army of the West in 1794–1795. He held interior posts during the rest of the French Revolutionary Wars and under the First French Empire of Napoleon.

== Life ==
=== Military career ===
==== Ancien Régime ====
He entered the École de cavalerie de Besançon then served as a volunteer in the régiment de Fumel-cavalerie (1756), and was promoted to cornette (1757). In the course of the Seven Years' War, he was involved in the Hanover campaign, rising to captain in 1760 and was demobilised at the peace.

Immediately re-entering the régiment de Conti-dragons, he taught the theory of major cavalry manoeuvres at the École de Besançon and published a book on tactics : Instruction à l'usage du régiment de dragons Conti. He rose to major (1768), mestre de camp (1773) with the rank of colonel, brigadier (1 January 1784) and was promoted to maréchal de camp on 10 March 1788, all the while remaining the commander of his regiment. He was made a knight of Saint Louis in 1773.

==== French Revolution ====
In 1790, he was one of the generals charged with verifying the regimental accounts and gathering their grievances. He was sent into Brittany in 1791 and 1792 to appease insurrection movements that had just broken out there, and to repress those that had not yet broken out. He brought himself to note by moderation and conciliatory spirit, winning a brilliant success near Quimper on 8 July.

On 7 September 1792 he was made lieutenant général and commander of the 13e division militaire, and was put in charge of embarking at Brest the troops intended for Saint-Domingue.

Made lieutenant general on 7 September 1792, the French National Convention put him in command of the Army of the Coasts of Brest. With scarcely 12,000 men, he successfully defended Nantes on 29 June 1793, after several fierce and deadly clashes repulsing an attack by a Vendéen army of 50,000 Vendéens under Jacques Cathelineau. Victorious again at the battle of Montaigu (against François de Charette, who he would defeat again at Mortagne-sur-Sèvre), he was defeated at the battle of Tiffauges and suspended from his command. Despite a subsequent success at Saint-Symphorien, he was then replaced on 29 September. He then retired to one of his estates, at the Château du Saussay (Essonne), but was recalled after the revolution of 9 thermidor year II (1794) and again made supreme commander of the Army of the West. He seconded Lazare Hoche to this army around the time of the counter-revolutionary invasion of France in 1795, sending him for some of the reinforcements he needed. Hoche replaced him in command later in 1795, and Canclaux retired from the army.

=== Administrative career ===
Sent to the Le Midi in 1796 to organise the army intended for Italy (what would become the Army of Italy), at the end of that year he was made ministre plénipotentiaire to the court of Naples, a role he held until 1797.

In 1799, he was recalled to state service as a member of the military committee established after the Directory. After the Coup of 18 Brumaire, he adhered to Napoleon's party, and as during the Consulate Napoleon put him in command of the 14e division militaire, at Caen, where he and general Gabriel Marie Joseph, comte d'Hédouville were charged with pacifying Normandy.

In 1800 he briefly became commander of the Army of Reserve of the Second Line, which formed the nucleus of the Army of the Grisons. He became inspector-general of the army's cavalry, and on 22 October 1804, he was appointed to the Sénat conservateur.

In 1806 and 1807, he was commander of the gardes nationaux of Seine-Inférieure and the Somme. In 1808 he was made a comte d'Empire.

In December 1813, he was extraordinary-commissioner in Ille-et-Vilaine.

In 1814, he voted in the Senate in favour of deposing Napoleon.

=== Restoration and the Hundred Days ===
Made a pair de France on the Restoration, Napoleon kept him as such during the Hundred Days but Canclaux refused to support him, though this did not prevent him being struck from the list of peers by the royal ordinance of 24 July 1815.

On 10 August 1815, he again became a pair de France and voted in favour of the death of Ney.

His name is inscribed on the Arc de Triomphe (west side)

His house according to the "Dictionnaire Historique Des Rues De Paris" was in Paris, Charles V rue no. 7, which is still inhabited.

== Sources ==
- Clerget, Charles (1905). "Tableaux des Armées Françaises pendant les Guerres de la Révolution" (in French). Paris: Librarie Militaire R. Chapelot et Cie.
- Mullié, Charles (1852). "Biographie des célébrités militaires des armées de terre et de mer de 1789 a 1850" (in French). Paris.

Military offices
Preceded by Anne François Augustin de La Bourdonnaye	Interim Commander-in-chief of the Army of the Coasts; 15–30 April 1793	Succeeded by Army of the Coasts of Brest
Preceded by Army of the Coasts	Commander-in-chief of the Army of the Coasts of Brest; 1 May–5 October 1793	Succeeded by Jean Antoine Rossignol
Preceded by Thomas-Alexandre Dumas	Commander-in-chief of the Army of the West; 24 October 1794 – 6 September 1795	Succeeded by Lazare Hoche
Preceded by Guillaume Brune	Commander-in-chief of the Army of the Reserve, Second Line; 16 August–2 September 1800	Succeeded by Jacques MacDonald
