= Army of England =

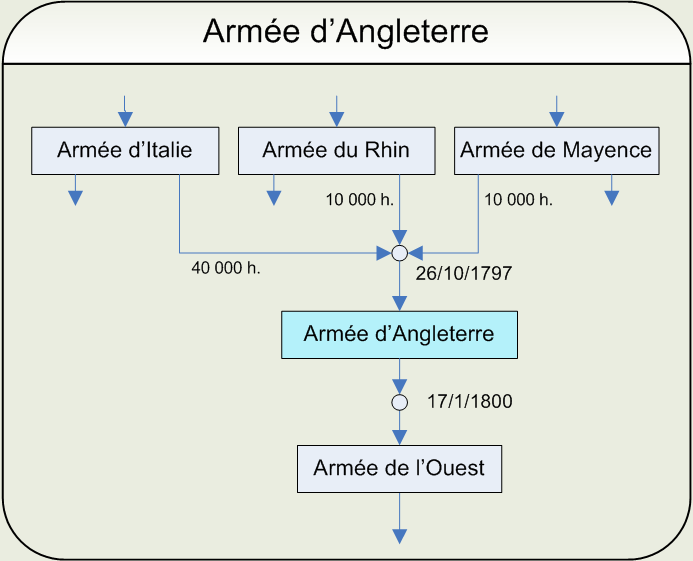
- Evolution of the Army of England
- Active: 26 October 1797 – 16 January 1800
- Country: French Republic
- Branch: French Revolutionary Army
- Engagements: Chouannerie

Commanders
- Commanders: Napoleon Bonaparte; Louis Desaix; Charles Edward Jennings de Kilmaine; Jean-François-Auguste Moulin; Jean Dembarrère; Claude Ignace François Michaud; Gabriel de Hédouville

The Army of England (French: Armée d'Angleterre) was a field army of the French Revolutionary Army that existed from 1797 to 1800.

== History ==
On 26 October 1797, the French Directory established the Army of England with the goal of invading Great Britain. By the end of the year, 40,000 men from the Army of Italy, along with 10,000 from both the Army of the Rhine and the Army of Mainz had been called to the new army, which was yet to be assembled. General Napoleon Bonaparte was appointed commander, with General Louis Desaix serving as provisional commander in Paris during Bonaparte's absence.

Although destined for an invasion of Great Britain, this plan was eventually abandoned, and instead the Army of England was charged with suppressing the Chouannerie of 1799, in Western France. On 14 January 1800, it was renamed the Army of the West and the order went into effect on 17 January.

== Commanders-in-chief ==
- 26 October 1797 – 12 April 1798: Napoleon Bonaparte. The army not being assembled, Bonaparte kept its headquarters in Paris.
- 26 October 1797 – 27 March 1798: Louis Desaix (provisional)
- 27 March – 7 October 1798: Charles Edward Jennings (provisional until the departure of the Army of the Orient on 19 May). With the arrival of troops, the army's headquarters are moved to Rouen.
- 8 October – 1 November 1798: Jean-François-Auguste Moulin, during Kilmaine's absence
- 2 November 1798 – 2 January 1799: Charles Edward Jennings
- 2 January – 22 June 1799: Jean-François-Auguste Moulin (provisional)
- 23 June – 19 July 1799: Jean Dembarrère (interim)
- 20 July – 14 November 1799: Claude Ignace François Michaud (provisional)
- 15 November 1799 – 16 January 1800: Gabriel de Hédouville

== See also ==
- Napoleon's planned invasion of the United Kingdom

== Sources ==
- Charles Clerget (1905). Tableaux des armées françaises pendant les guerres de la Révolution. Paris.
- Jean Tulard; Jean-François Fayard; Alfred Fierro (1998) [1987]. Histoire et dictionnaire de la Révolution française. 1789-1799. Paris: Éditions Robert Laffont.
