= Paul Petit =

Paul Petit may refer to:

- Paul Petit (aviator) (1890–1918), World War I flying ace
- Paul Petit (writer) (1893–1944), French writer, sociologist, diplomat and French Resistance worker
- Paul Petit (historian) (1914–1981), French scholar of Roman history
- Paul Petit (racing driver) (born 1993), French racing driver

== See also ==
- Paul Petiet (1770–1849), French adjutant-general during the Napoleonic Wars
- Paul Pettit (1931–2020), Major League Baseball pitcher
- Paul Pettitt, British archaeologist
- Petit Paul, 2018 comic book by Bastien Vivès
