= Amédée Willot =

Count and MP at the Five-Hundred Council

Amédée Willot de Gramprez
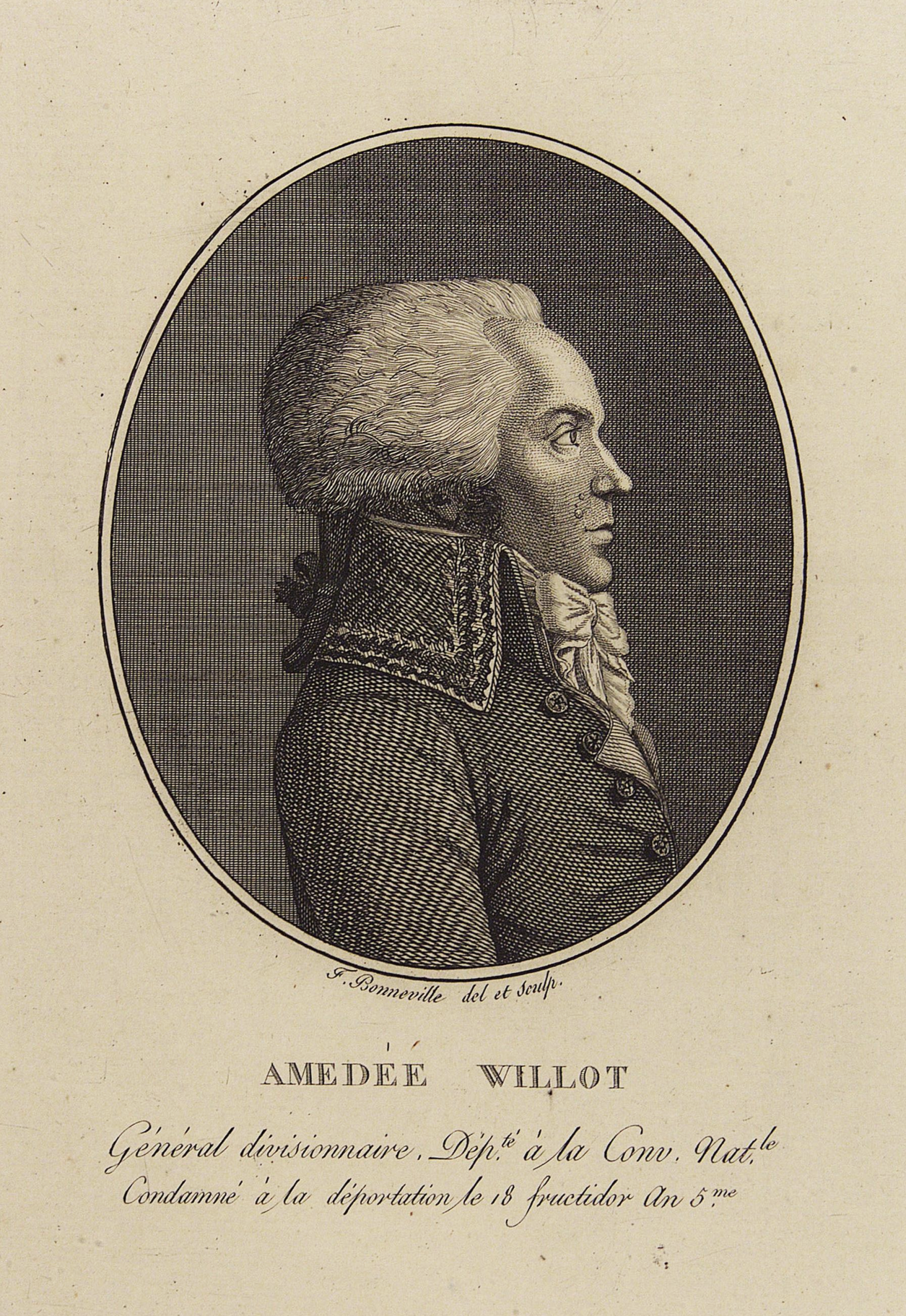
- Generel Amédée Willot de Gramprez
- Born: 31 August 1755; Belfort, France
- Died: 17 December 1823 (aged 68); Boissy-Saint-Léger, Val-de-Marne, France
- Military career
- Allegiance: Kingdom of France; France
- Branch: Infantry
- Service years: (Kingdom of France) 1771–1792 (France) 1792–1797 (Kingdom of France) 1798–1818
- Rank: General of Division
- Conflicts: War of the Pyrenees; War in the Vendée
- Awards: Légion d'Honneur, 1816; Order of Saint-Louis, 1821
- Other work: Baron, 1815, Count, 1816

Amédée Willot, Count of Gramprez, (English: /wiːˈloʊ/ wee-LOH, French: [amede wilo]; 31 August 1755 – 17 December 1823) held several military commands during the French Revolutionary Wars but his association with Jean-Charles Pichegru led to his exile from France in 1797. He joined the French Royal Army as a volunteer in 1771 and was a captain by 1787. He was elected commander of a volunteer battalion in 1792 and served in the War of the Pyrenees. Shortly after being promoted commander of a light infantry regiment Willot was appointed general of brigade in June 1793. A few months later he was denounced as a Royalist and jailed. In the light of later events, this may have been an accurate assessment of Willot's sentiments. After release from prison in January 1795, he led troops in Spain during the summer campaign. He was promoted to general of division in July 1795.

Willot transferred to the War in the Vendée where he served until spring 1796. During this period he was temporarily in command of the Army of the West. He was in charge of the 8th Military Division at Marseille until his election to the Council of Five Hundred in April 1797. He aligned himself with the Royalists who were regarded as a threat by powerful men in the French Directory. After the Coup of 18 Fructidor he was deported to French Guiana with others belonging to Pichegru's faction, but later escaped. Willot overtly embraced the Royalist cause and worked with France's enemies to overthrow the French First Republic. After drifting to several nations, he spent the years of the First French Empire in the United States. Returning to France with King Louis XVIII he was ennobled as a count and given awards for his loyalty. His surname is one of the names inscribed under the Arc de Triomphe, on Column 34.

== Early career ==
Willot was born in Belfort, France on 31 August 1755. He joined the army as a volunteer in the provincial Mantes Regiment in 1771 and by 1787 he had become a captain of grenadiers. His regiment was disbanded in March 1791 and he soon was appointed commander of the National Guard of Saint-Germain-en-Laye. In June 1791 he became aide-de-camp to Lieutenant General Claude Gabriel de Choisy. On 23 March 1792 he was elected lieutenant colonel of the 5th Chasseurs Cantabres Battalion. Willot was put in charge of 500 regulars and 1,000 volunteers and sent to block a Spanish thrust in the eastern Pyrenees at Céret. On 20 April 1793, the Spanish column defeated the French, capturing the bridge over the Tech River and capturing four cannons. This occurred in the Army of the Eastern Pyrenees sector. A 1793 order of battle listed the 5th Light Infantry Battalion in the Army of the Western Pyrenees. The 5th Chasseurs Cantabres became the 5th Light Infantry Battalion in 1791 and was expanded into the 5th Light Infantry Demi-brigade during the 1793 amalgame.

== General officer ==
On 1 June 1793, Joseph Marie Servan de Gerbey promoted Willot to chef de brigade (colonel) of the enlarged 5th Light. The unit was engaged in an action at Chateau-Pignon on 6 June and stormed the Montaigne Louis XIV redoubt on 22 June. These battles occurred in the Army of the Western Pyrenees sector. On 23 June, the representatives on mission elevated Willot to the rank of general of brigade and assigned him to lead the army advance guard. However, on 4 October 1793 he was removed from command as a suspected Royalist and incarcerated at Bayonne. The army commander Étienne Deprez-Crassier was dismissed on the same day and arrested four days later.

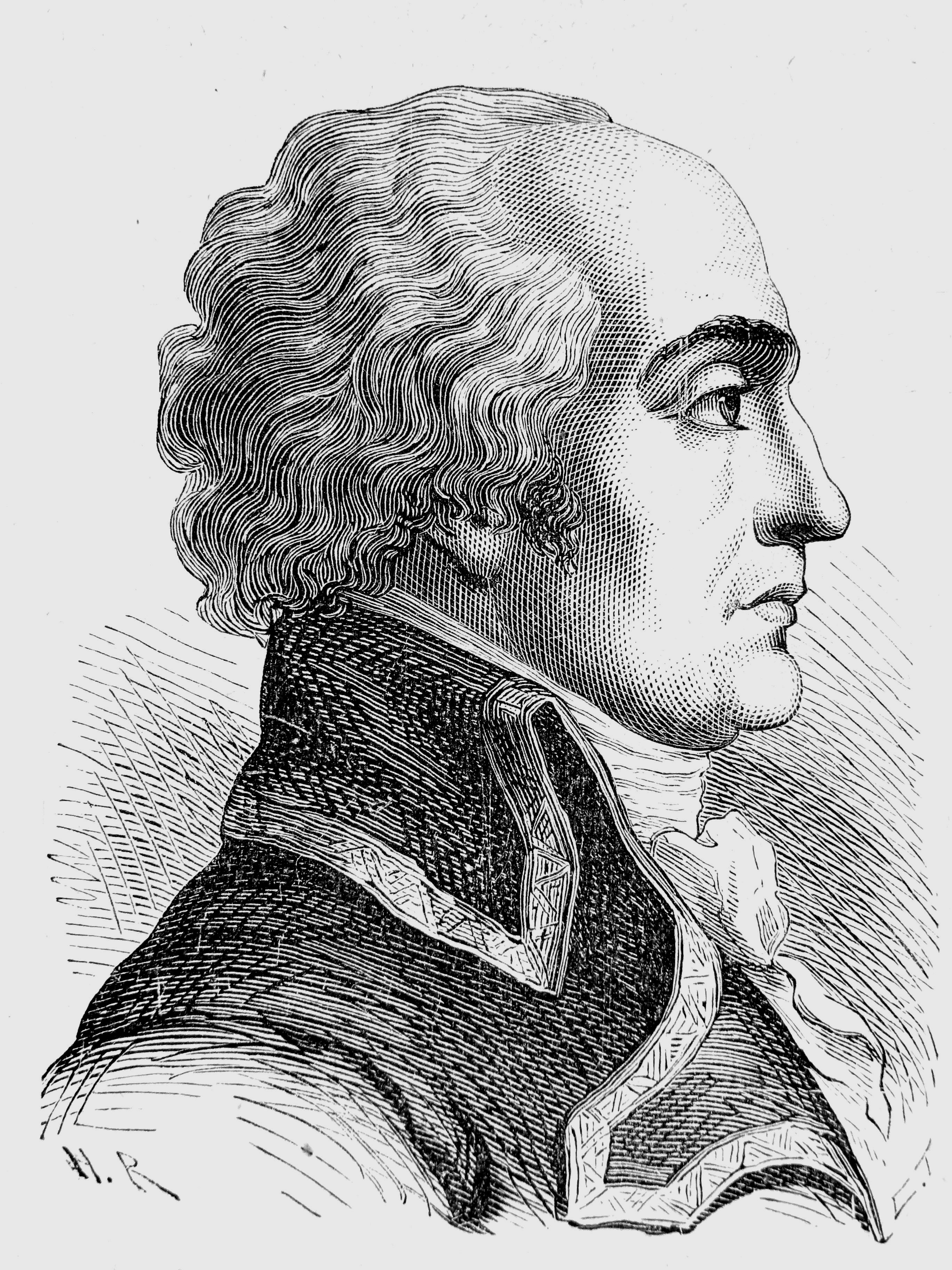
Joseph Marie Servan

Willot finally emerged from prison in January 1795. He regained his rank as general of brigade on 13 April. He became the acting commander of the 1st Division of the Army of the Western Pyrenees in place of Jean-Antoine Marbot. On 6 July 1795 he was promoted general of division. On 13 July, the army commander Bon-Adrien Jeannot de Moncey sent Willot and 3,500 troops from Salvatierra toward Vitoria while another 4,500-man column under Bernard Dessein reached Vitoria from the north. The Spanish troops managed to slip out of the trap but they were forced to abandon their supplies. Dessein and Willot then joined forces and occupied Bilbao. When the news of the Treaty of Basel arrived on 5 August 1795, the French occupied Miranda de Ebro. The French troops started back to Bayonne on 17 August. Two divisions numbering 10,995 soldiers were assembled under Willot and Dessein and ordered to march to join Lazare Hoche's Army of the West. By the time the reinforcement reached its destination at Fontenay-le-Comte, heavy desertion reduced its numbers to 4,000 men.

The reinforcement missed the Battle of Quiberon on 21 July 1795 where Hoche smashed the Royalists. Historian Ramsay Weston Phipps stated that Willot became "a thorn in Hoche's side", without giving an explanation. Yet when Hoche was called to Paris on 17 December, Willot assumed the acting command of the Army of the West. He held the interim leadership role from 18 December until 6 January 1796. Later, Willot was given command of the South Division rather than the more senior Emmanuel Grouchy who was miffed at being passed over. By March 1796 the War in the Vendée was practically won and Hoche turned his attention to the Chouannerie which was suppressed by May. Though they lost the war, the rebels gained some rights. This outcome was denounced by some in Paris who blamed Hoche; the same people praised Willot.

On 13 April 1796, Willot transferred to the Army of Rhin-et-Moselle. He took command of the 8th Military Division on 25 July the same year. This was in Marseille where he claimed to be impartial but managed to offend the Jacobin party. Napoleon Bonaparte was influential in getting him removed. At this time he joined the Royalist faction. Evidently, his political leanings were well known because Pierre Augereau blustered that Willot in Marseille had nearly sabotaged the Battle of Arcole campaign by failing to reinforce the Army of Italy. Willot was elected to the Council of Five Hundred on 11 April 1797. He was elected for the Bouches-du-Rhône by 102 out of 203 votes. He became the council's secretary and later inspector.

== Exile and return ==
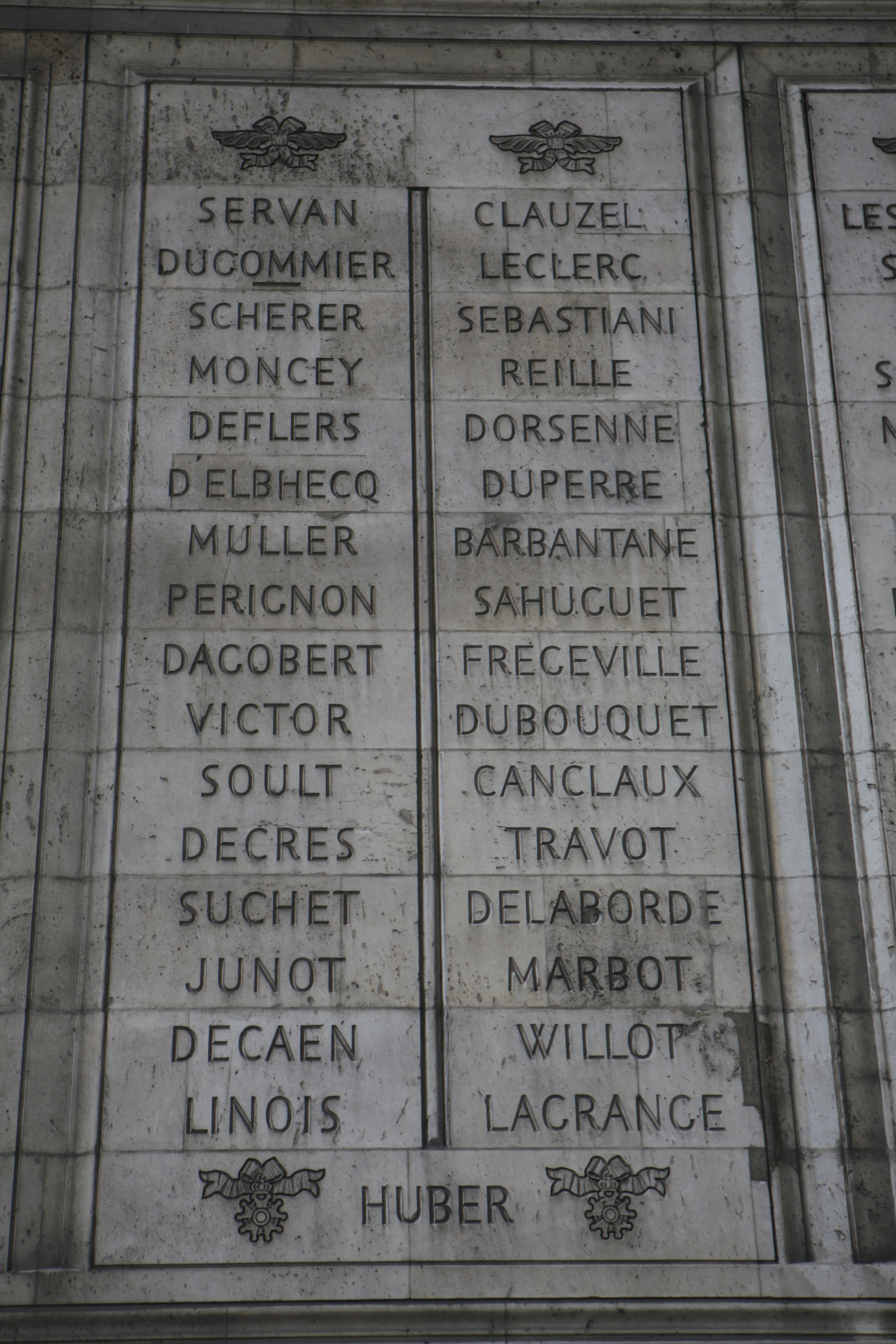
Willot is name 15 on Column 34.

The French Directory was an increasingly unpopular government and the Council of Five Hundred and the Council of Ancients had no legal means to restrain the Directory. The Directors Paul François Jean Nicolas, vicomte de Barras, Jean-François Rewbell and Louis Marie de La Révellière-Lépeaux were known as the Triumvirate and held the most power. The other two directors, Lazare Carnot and François-Marie, marquis de Barthélemy as well as a swelling majority of the Five Hundred and the Ancients were in the opposition which wanted a change in government and a stop to the endless wars. The opposition included both Republicans who wanted better government and avowed Royalists such as Jean-Charles Pichegru and Willot. Unfortunately for the opposition the two factions were not able to coordinate their efforts. Foolishly, the Royalists refused to assure the Republican members of the opposition that they would not be punished if the House of Bourbon returned. Meanwhile, the Triumvirate was alarmed by the growing strength of their enemies.

Another blunder made by the opposition was making an enemy of Bonaparte at a time when he was a national hero for his victories in Italy. Despite being warned by members of the opposition Club de Clichy, the outspoken Jacques-Victor Dumolard offended Bonaparte in a speech made to the Five Hundred. After thinking about sending troops from his army to overthrow the opposition in Paris, Bonaparte decided against it. On 3 June 1797, Bonaparte sent the Directory proof that Pichegru was in treasonous contact with France's enemies. Though Bonaparte proved coy, Hoche, the commander of the Army of Sambre-et-Meuse was eager to intervene on behalf of the Triumvirate. On 9 July 1797, Hoche sent 9,000 troops under Louis Lemoine marching toward Paris. The attempted coup collapsed and the troops withdrew when it was discovered that Hoche was too young to assume the position of Minister of War. Though it was obvious what was going on, the divided opposition was unable to implement effective countermeasures. Barras and his confederates resolved to try again and Bonaparte sent Augereau to help execute the coup.

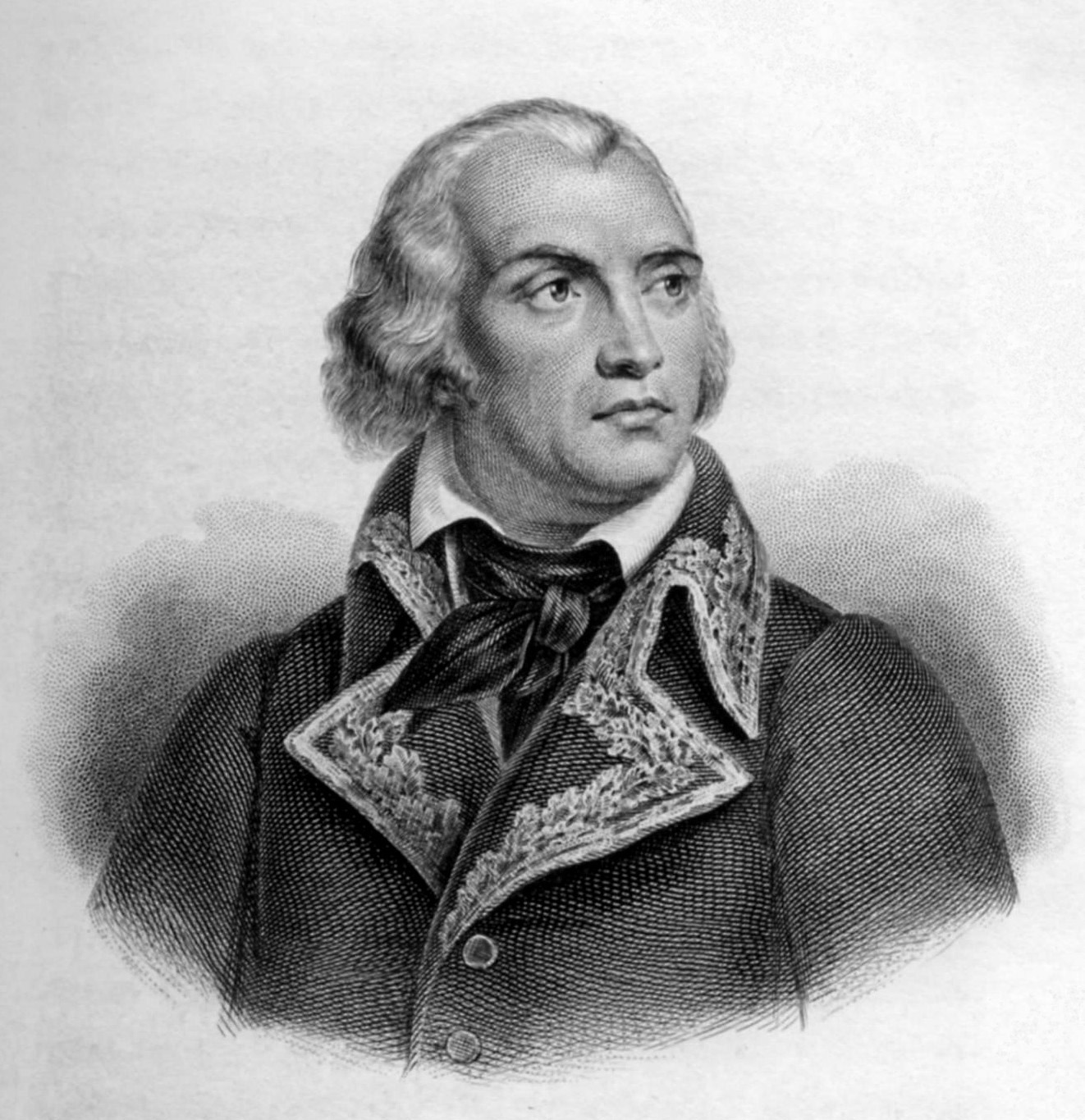
Jean-Charles Pichegru

During this period Pichegru was strangely inert. Because of his stature, he prevented more active men like Willot from carrying out plans to defend against the Triumvirate. The Coup of 18 Fructidor occurred on 4 September 1797 as soldiers under Augereau and Lemoine occupied key positions in Paris. Pichegru and Willot spent the morning in the Tuileries Palace. The troops that were supposed to defend the elected assemblies joined the coup or melted away. Pichegru, Willot and Barthélemy were arrested but Carnot managed to escape abroad. They and 51 others were sentenced to be transported to Sinnamary (Cayenne) where it was expected that the so-called "dry guillotine" of tropical diseases would soon kill them. The carriages that took the prisoners to the seaports were fitted with iron bars so none could escape.

Pichegru and three other deportees escaped from French Guiana by boat on 3 June 1798, but Willot and François Aubry fell desperately ill with fever and were unable to join them. Aubry soon died but Willot recovered and got away that same month. In 1799, Pichegru and Willot actively plotted to stir up Royalist revolts in France. On 1 June 1799, Pierre Marie Barthélemy Ferino wrote to the French army commander André Masséna that Pichegru, Willot and Carnot were traveling with Archduke Charles, Duke of Teschen, the commander of the Habsburg Austrian army. Ferino was wrong about Carnot but correct about the others. Pichegru planned to lead the rebellion in Franche-Comté, Willot in Marseille and Louis François Perrin de Précy in Lyon. Their efforts came to nothing because Masséna won his masterly victory at the Second Battle of Zurich on 25 September 1799.

Though he could have taken advantage of the amnesty after the Coup of 18 Brumaire on 9 November 1799, Willot was too deeply involved as a Royalist; he chose to remain in exile. In 1800, he formed a corps of Royalist volunteers with the purpose of attacking the south of France. Soon afterward, he took refuge with King Ferdinand of Naples who appointed him commandant of Elba. In 1802 Willot went first to Menorca and then to London. Finally, in 1804 he traveled to the United States where he had contact with the exiled Jean Victor Marie Moreau. On 21 July 1813 he left the United States for England. After Emperor Napoleon abdicated in 1814, Willot returned to France with King Louis XVIII. During the Hundred Days of Napoleon's return from exile, he withdrew to Ghent in Belgium.

On 15 November 1815, Willot was reinstated as a general officer and became eligible for retirement pay. On 5 December that year the king made him a baron. King Louis showered honors on him the following year. The sovereign appointed him commander of the 23rd Military Division in Corsica on 20 January, made him a count on 2 March and awarded him the Commander's Cross of the Légion d'Honneur on 4 April 1816. Willot retired from his military post on 6 May 1818 and received the Order of Saint Louis on 1 May 1821. He died at Santenay, now in Val-de-Marne, near Paris on 17 December 1823. WILLOT is one of the names inscribed under the Arc de Triomphe on the west side on Column 34.

== Notes ==
Military offices
Preceded by Lazare Hoche	Interim Commander-in-chief of the Army of the West; 18 December 1795–6 January 1796	Succeeded by Absorbed by Army of the Coasts of the Ocean
