= Army of the Coasts of the Ocean (1796) =

- Active: 5 January – 22 September 1796
- Country: (France) French First Republic
- Branch: Army
- Type: Army
- Size: 117,746–182,956 soldiers
- Engagements: War in the Vendée

Commanders
- Notable commanders: Lazare Hoche

The Army of the Coasts of the Ocean (French: Armée des côtes de l'Océan) was a French Revolutionary Army that was only in existence during 1796. The army was formed by combining the three armies that were engaged in the War in the Vendée and appointing Lazare Hoche to command. While the army's nominal strength was 182,956 men at the time of its formation, this declined to 117,746 during the year. Because its operations were successful, the army was disbanded in September 1796 and approximately half its personnel sent to other armies.

== History ==
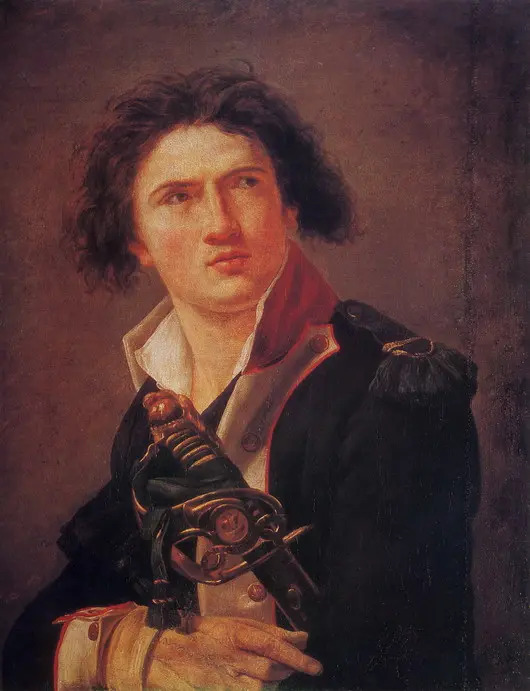
Lazare Hoche

The Army of the Coasts of the Ocean was created by an order of 26 December 1795 which was executed on 5–8 January 1796. The army was formed by combining the Army of the West, the Army of the Coasts of Brest and the Army of the Coasts of Cherbourg. Its first and only commander-in-chief was Lazare Hoche, although from 10 July until mid-August the chief of staff Gabriel Marie Joseph, comte d'Hédouville carried out the orders of Hoche while he was in Paris. Hoche arrived in Angers on 5 January and took over the Army of the West the next day. He assumed command of the Brest and Cherbourg armies on 8 January. On its creation, the army's paper strength was 182,956 soldiers, though only about 100,000 troops were available. The former armies became divisions in the new army; the Brest army became the West Division, the Cherbourg army became the East Division and the Army of the West became the South Division. South was led by Amédée Willot.

Hoche had much experience with the War in the Vendée. He was appointed commander of the Army of the Coasts of Cherbourg on 1 September 1794 and he also assumed leadership of the Army of the Coasts of Brest starting on 10 November 1794. His tenure with the Cherbourg army ended on 30 April 1795 when Jean-Baptiste Annibal Aubert du Bayet took command. Hoche continued to lead the Brest army until 10 September 1795 when Gabriel Venance Rey replaced him. On 11 September he became commander of the Army of the West and led it until 17 December 1795 when Willot temporarily replaced him. When Hoche took command of the Army of the Coasts of the Ocean, 11 army commanders and 120 general officers had been employed in putting down the Vendean rebellion, without success. Uniquely, he learned how to deal with the revolt.

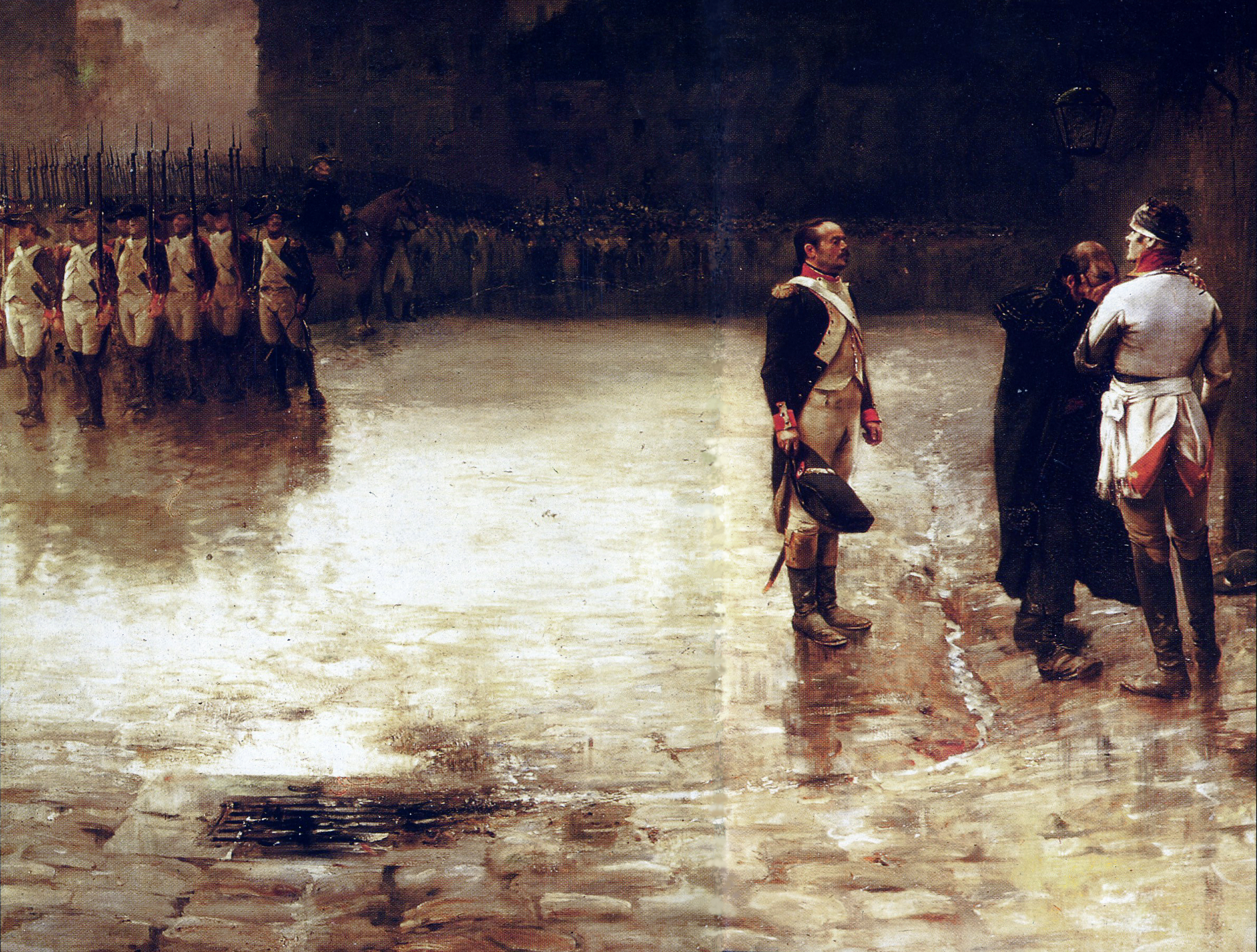
Execution of Charette, in Nantes, March 1796, by Julien Le Blant

By 1796 Hoche had a free hand because, unlike earlier governments, the French Directory did not need to approve every operation. With unity of command and near-dictatorial powers, his expeditions continuously pressed the insurgents. An earlier truce worked in his favor by allowing the rebels to briefly enjoy peace; afterward they were less inclined to fight. Elsewhere, French victories over the First Coalition armies made Royalist prospects look dim. At length, rebel leaders Jean-Nicolas Stofflet and François de Charette were captured and executed. By March 1796 the south bank of the Loire River was pacified and Hoche deployed 15,000 infantry and two cavalry regiments against the Chouans on the north bank. By May the Chouannerie was quelled after most of the leaders were captured or gave up. In return for peace, Hoche promised that the priests had religious freedom while the young men would not be conscripted into the army. About 2,000 Republican deserters fighting for the rebels surrendered and their only punishment was to return to the Republican army. The hard-liners were not pleased with Hoche's lenient terms and wished that Willot had been in charge. However, the Directory was so thankful for Hoche's efforts that it publicly proclaimed him Pacificateur and bought him a pair of pistols, two good horses and riding tack.

On 25 August 1796 the French government issued an order to dissolve the Army of the Coasts of the Ocean and it was carried out on 22 September. As early as 13 July, Hoche sent 13,078 troops to Italy and 27,000 to the forces on the Rhine River. While a total of 44,662 soldiers were sent to defend the frontiers, another 19,253 were reserved for the Expedition to Ireland of 1797. Out of a one-time total of 117,746 men, the remaining 53,831 men were retained in the so-called "Four Reunited Divisions", each commanded by a general. These were the 12th, 13th, 14th and 22nd Military Divisions. Hoche remained as overall commander of the four districts with Hédouville as his chief of staff. In September 1796 Emmanuel Grouchy took command of the 12th Division (Poitou) which consisted of the departments of Charente-Inférieure, Deux-Sèvres, Loire-Inférieure and Vendée south of the Loire. The 13th Division (Brittany) included the departments of Côtes-du-Nord, Finistère, Ille-et-Vilaine and Morbihan, the 14th Division (Normandy) the departments of Calvados, Manche and Orne and the 22nd Division (Maine and Anjou) the departments of Indre-et-Loire, Loir-et-Cher, Maine-et-Loire, Mayenne and Sarthe.

== Commanders in Chief ==
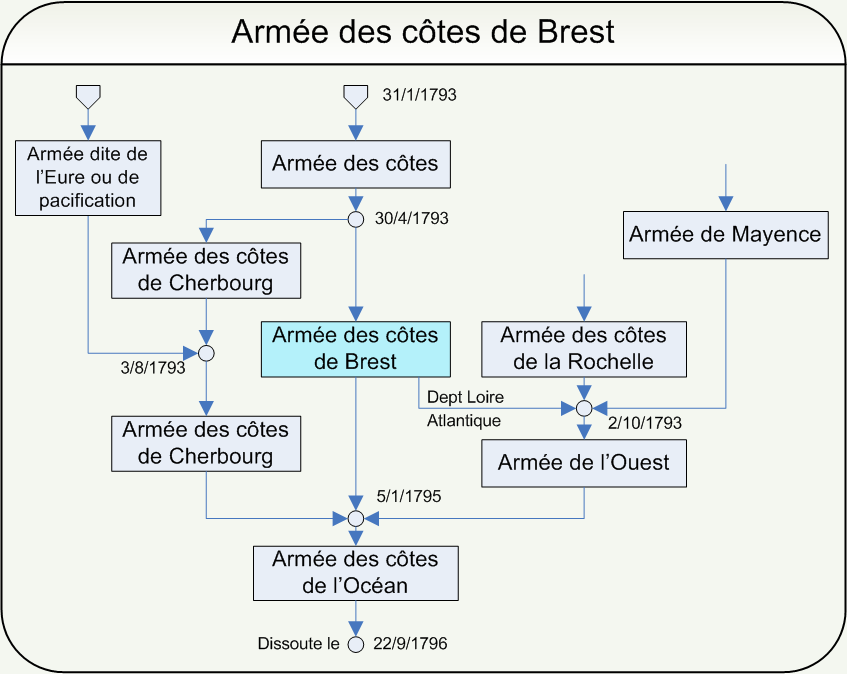
Evolution of the Army of the Coasts of the Ocean (bottom)

- Lazare Hoche: 5 January – 10 July 1796
- Gabriel Marie Joseph, comte d'Hédouville: intermediate 10 July – mid-August 1796
- Lazare Hoche: Mid-August – 22 September 1796
