= Army of the Coasts of the Ocean =

Army of the Coasts of the Ocean or Armée des côtes de l'Océan may refer to:

- Army of the Coasts of the Ocean (1796)
- Army of the Coasts of the Ocean (1804), part of the French Revolutionary Army
