= Clerget (disambiguation) =

Clerget may refer to:

- Axel Clerget (born 1987), French judoka
- Charles Clerget (1795–1849), French army officer
- Clerget aircraft engines, designed by the French engineer Pierre Clerget(fr)
- Clerget-Blin a defunct French aircraft engine manufacturer founded by Pierre Clerget and Eugène Blin

== See also ==
- Clergé, French athlete and 18th-century world champion of real tennis
