= Claude Louis Petiet =

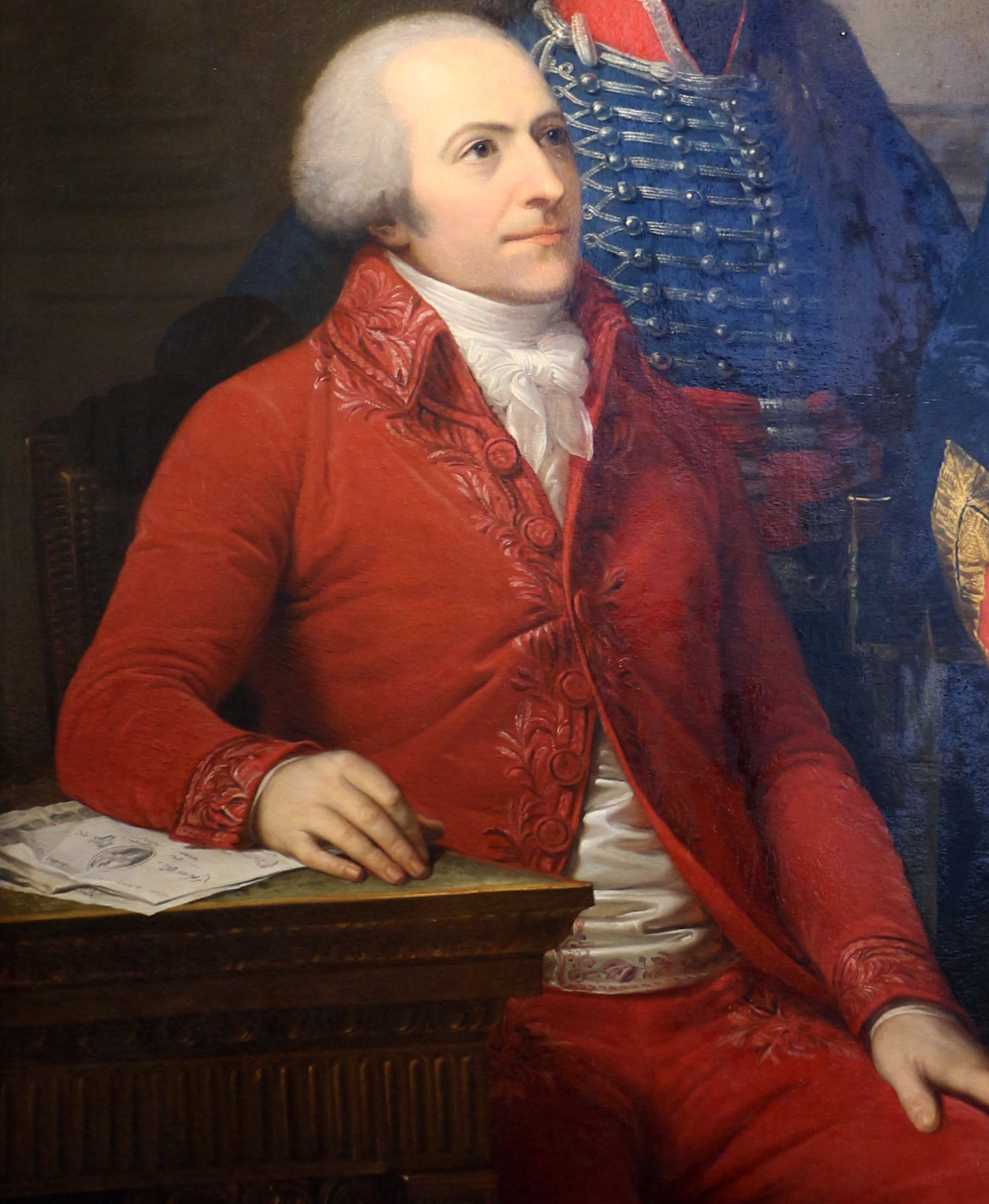

Claude Louis Petiet (French: [klod lwi pətje]; 9 February 1749, Châtillon-sur-Seine, Côte-d'Or – 25 May 1806, Paris) was a Commissioner of war in 1778, elected to the Council of Elders in 1795, and was appointed Minister of War on 8 February 1796. He was dismissed on 14 July 1797 by the French Directory of Paul Barras, Jean-François Reubell and Louis Marie de La Révellière-Lépeaux. Appointed to the State Council by Napoleon Bonaparte, he became steward of the army camp at Boulogne in 1805 and senator in 1806.

== Biography ==
- Constable in the company of Queen's, 20 October 1766.
- Subdelegation general stewardship of Britain, 1 September 1775
- Commissioner of war (leased office 30 September 1778).
- Employed in Saint-Malo 26 December 1778 Acting Administrator dated 25 June 1779 to August 1780.
- Clerk Police Coast Guard Division of Brest, 8 March 1782.
- Employed at Rennes in 1788.
- Attorney General Trustee of Ille-et-Vilaine, June 1790.
- Commissary, military chief judge of the 13th Division, October 1791.
- Commissioner General of the Army of the Center, 31 March 1792, passed in the same capacity with the army of the Ardennes on 1 October 1792. Returned to the 13th Division, 31 October 1792.
- Employed at Lorient by representatives of the people in the West for supplying Lorient Belle-Ile, Port-Louis and Croix, 15 February 1793.
- Authorizing the Chief of Army coast, 25 February 1793.
- Authorizing the Chief of Brest and Côtes de Cherbourg on 1 May 1793. This service meets the 13th Division of 20 September 1793.

Suspended by the representatives of the people and placed under arrest on 2 December 1793, he returned to his post by the same representatives on 29 December 1793.

- Authorizing the Chief of the Army of Sambre and Meuse, 15 April 1795. Spent in that capacity in the army coast of Brest, 19 June 1795.
- Member of the council of elders in October 1795.
- Member of Ille-et-Vilaine and Côte-d'Or.
- Minister of War, 8 February 1796 (he signed the decree appointing General Bonaparte in command of the army of Italy).

Out of the legislature, 20 May 1797, he was removed from his post as Minister of War on 23 July 1797.

- Member of the Council of Five Hundred in 1799.
- Head of the First Division in the Ministry of War, 12 November 1799.
- State Councilor, 24 December 1799.
- Chief Inspector journals, 7 February 1800.
- On a mission in Geneva, 28 April 1800 [1]
- Cisalpine Minister extraordinary in 1800, Chairman of the Extraordinary Commission of Government of the Cisalpine Republic (1800–1802) and President of the Consulta (1800–1802).
- State Councilor extraordinary service, 22 September 1800; Replaced in the inspectorate, 19 September 1801.
- Commissioner General of the six camps, 22 June 1803.
- Chairman of the Electoral College of the Yonne, 25 February 1805.
- Quartermaster General of the Grand Army, 29 August 1805 (organizing the camp of Boulogne and the campaign of Austerlitz).
- Senator, 19 May 1806.

He died on 25 May 1806 in his hotel, the current 8 Rue Monsieur in Paris 7th then 6 rue de Frejus.

Napoleon did make a grandiose funeral on 27 May, attended the Senate, and the principal dignitaries of the Empire. After the ceremony, which took place in the Church of Foreign Missions Rue du Bac, his body was transported to the Pantheon. His eulogy was delivered by the Gaspard Monge, President of the Senate who traced his long career. However, when a friend of the family seeking a pension for Petiet's widow, the Emperor refused stating

... Mr. Petiet how did he not become rich, I gave him 20 times the opportunity to make his fortune?

It was the Senate and not the Emperor who awarded a pension to his widow of 6,000 f. Later when a prisoner on St. Helena, Napoleon seems to have had a change of heart for he wrote:

The eminent services rendered Petiet Minister in the administration of the war, particularly the merit of being the first since the revolution that had presented a clear and specific spending, his ministry has not saved him from disgrace. However, while as always, in his long public service career he was noted for his integrity. He died penniless leaving an inheritance to his children that the esteem which was so justly acquired him.

== Campaigns ==
- 1779, Cotes de Bretagne;
- 1792 military center and the Ardennes;
- 1793, 1794, 1795, Army Odds and Sambre and Meuse;
- 1805 Ulm and Austerlitz, Grand Army.

== Decorations ==
- Knight of St. Louis, 15 April 1792
- Member of the Legion of Honor, 20 October 1803
- Commander, 14 June 1804
- Grand Officer, 8 May 1806.

== Family ==
Petiet had three notable sons:

- Pierre François (1782–1835), his eldest son, became a senior French official under the First French Empire and a Baron of the Empire in 1811.
- Auguste-Louis (1784–1858), his youngest son, became a general and politician of the nineteenth century, and a Baron of the Empire in 1814.

Another son, Sylvain, wrote Souvenirs d'un page de l'empereur in which he describes his father's career, and that his father married a woman from Brittany.

== Legacy ==
Fifty years after the death of the surveyor-general on 13 February 1854, Sainte-Beuve wrote in his Lectures on Monday:

Amidst the scandals that characterize the administration of the Directory, the Ministry Petiet was an honorable exception. This minister, a good and deserving man, strove to keep proper accounts and after a fiscal year, he submitted the complete picture of its operations to the judgment of Legislative Council and the public; He did without hesitation and with sincerity

At the time of the coup d'état Fructidor, he warned his friends in the passage of Hoche's troops within the "constitutional radius" no troops should cross without the permission of the legislature. This leads to the arrest of the Executive to the rostrum of the Five Hundred, 30 Messidor by Delahaye. At the time of the coup d'état of 30 Messidor with Lucien Bonaparte, Jourdan and Augereau, he will ask for their resignation Larevelliere and Merlin.

In a letter dated 17 October 1799, to Caesar de la Tour-Maubourg, Lafayette wrote:

Petiet, a close friend of Moreau, requested to inform me that his friend did not ... the character out of the ordinary course and in a word, good for a head battle, it was not clean a company. It has caused yet fully with it and wait for news of this conversation.

It is true that as minister of war, Petiet had signed the appointment of Bonaparte at the head of the army of Italy and Moreau to the head of the Rhine. In a note to General Regnier, Moreau says:

Aubert de Bayet no longer minister of war, the commissioner who replaces Petiet. I know he is a man of great talent.

In his memoires, his son Auguste-Louis wrote:

I delivered my dispatches to the Emperor asking for my name, I replied through my tears, remembering he had probably seen me at Austerlitz, Napoleon again point of the question he had posed. "Your father told me he was an honest man, he has done a lot for the state, he will live in history".

== Notes ==
Political offices
Preceded by Jean-Baptiste Aubert-Dubayet	Secretary of State for War; 8 February 1796 – 15 July 1797	Succeeded by Lazare Hoche
