= Antoine-Laurent Castellan =

French painter, architect, and engraver (1772–1838)

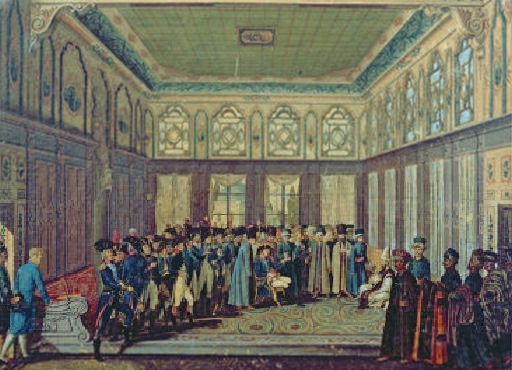
General Aubert Dubayet with French officers being received by the Grand Vizier in 1796, painting from 1797.

Antoine-Laurent Castellan (1772–1838) was a French painter, architect, and engraver.

== Life ==
Castellan was born at Montpellier in 1772. After having studied landscape painting under Valenciennes, he visited Turkey, Greece, Italy, and Switzerland, and published several series of letters upon those parts, illustrated with views drawn and engraved by himself. His best-known work is the Moeurs, usages, costumes des Othomans, published in 1812, and highly praised by Lord Byron. He also wrote Etudes sur le Chateau de Fontainebleau, which was not published until after his death. He was also the inventor of a new process of painting in wax.

He died in Paris in 1838.

== Works ==
- Castellan, Antoine Laurent (1819). Lettres sur l'Italie. 1.
- Castellan, Antoine Laurent (1819). Lettres sur l'Italie. 3.
