= Army of the Coasts of Cherbourg =

French Revolutionary Army

The Army of the Cherbourg coasts (French: Armée des côtes de Cherbourg) was a French Revolutionary Army.

== Combat record ==
Formed by splitting the Army of the Coasts in April 1793, it was put under the command of Georges Félix de Wimpffen and charged with defending the coasts of Manche against British invasion, and fighting against federalist revolts in Normandy and Caen. However, Wimpffen switched sides, and allied to the Girondists and so was removed from his post. He was replaced by Charles Guillaume Sepher. Following inactive combat, in 1794 it was merged with the Army of the Coasts of Brest, under Lazare Hoche then from May to November 1795 under Jean-Baptiste Annibal Aubert du Bayet.

== Members ==
- Gabriel Marie Joseph d'Hédouville — général de brigade.

== See also ==
- Armées of the French First Republic
- Cherbourg-Octeville topics
