= Coup of 18 Fructidor =

1797 seizure of power in France

- Part of the French Revolution
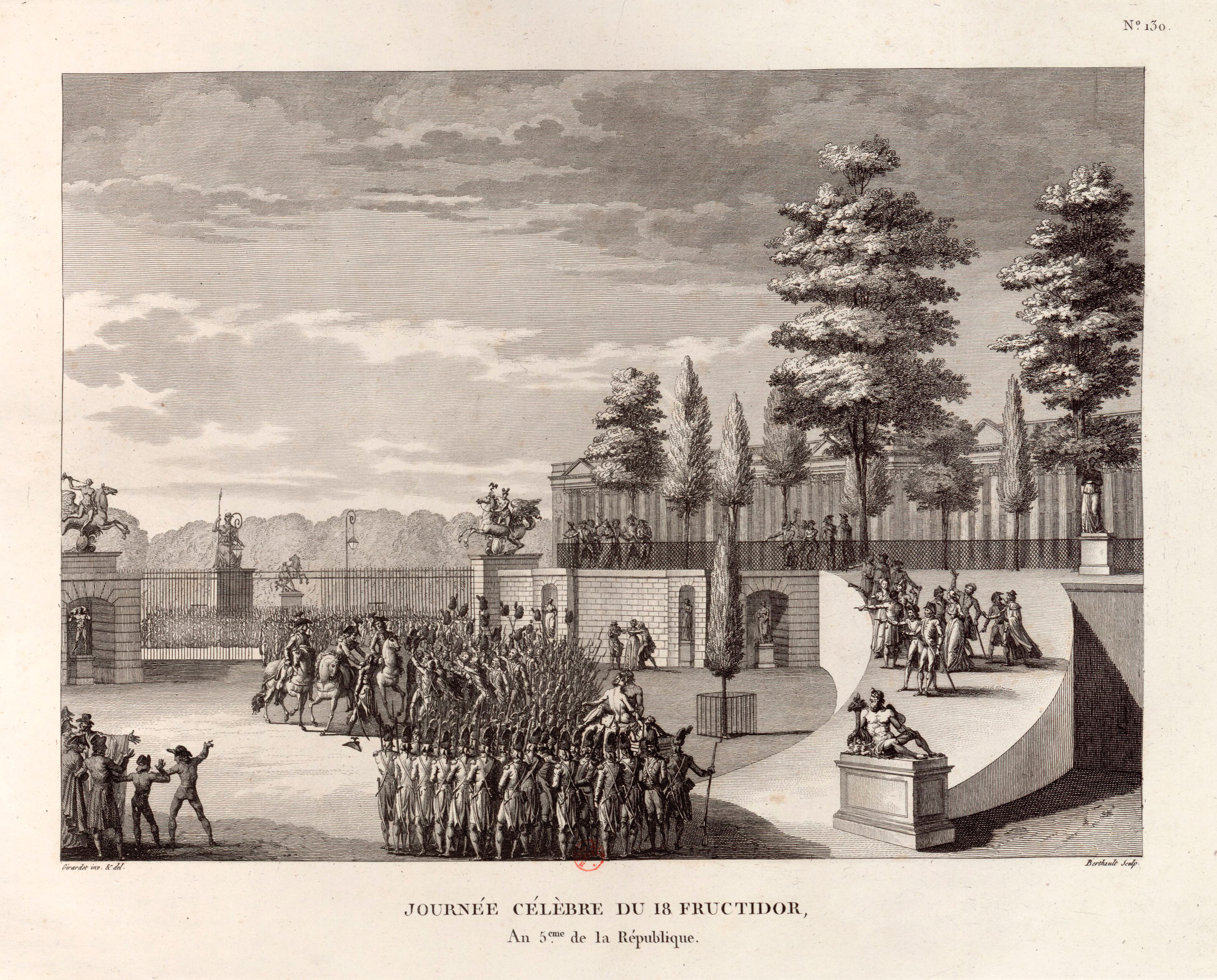
- Acting for the coup's leaders, General Charles-Pierre Augereau stormed the Tuileries Palace to arrest Charles Pichegru and others accused of plotting a counter-revolution.
Date	4 September 1797
Location	Paris, France
Result	Republican victory: End of the monarchist majority in the legislative chambers; Suppression of the Clichy Club; Exile, deportation or imprisonment of several monarchists

Belligerents
French Directory	Royalists in the Council of Ancients and the Council of Five Hundred

Commanders and leaders
Political: Jean-François Reubell; Louis Marie de La Révellière-Lépeaux; Paul Barras Military: Charles-Pierre Augereau (Sent by General Napoleon Bonaparte); Lazare Hoche	François-Marie Barthélemy; Charles Pichegru; François Barbé-Marbois

Strength
30,000 soldiers	216 royalist deputies

Casualties and losses
	65 deputies deported to French Guiana; 18 imprisoned; 3 runaways

The Coup of 18 Fructidor, Year V (4 September 1797 in the French Republican Calendar), was a seizure of power in France by members of the Directory, then forming the government of the French First Republic, with support from the military. The coup was provoked by the results of elections held months earlier, which had given the majority of seats in the country's Corps législatif (Legislative body) to royalist candidates, threatening a restoration of the monarchy and a return to the ancien régime. Three of the five members of the Directory, Paul Barras, Jean-François Rewbell and Louis Marie de La Révellière-Lépeaux, with support of foreign minister Charles Maurice de Talleyrand-Périgord, staged the coup d'état that annulled many of the previous election's results and ousted the monarchists from the legislature.

== History ==
Royalist candidates had gained 87 seats in the 1795 elections, where a third of the seats were at stake. A reversal of the majority in favor of royalists and moderate republicans in the two chambers of the legislature, the Council of Five Hundred and the Council of the Ancients, took place in the elections of April 1797. Soon the new majority repealed laws against priests who did not take the oath of the Civil Constitution of the Clergy and emigrés, and demanded the removal of four Jacobin government ministers from office.

Under the royalist majority, the Marquess of Barthélemy, a known monarchist, was elected member of the Directory by the chambers, in replacement of the leaving director Letourneur. François Barbé-Marbois was elected president of the Council of the Ancients, and Jean-Charles Pichegru, a figure widely assumed to be a sympathetic to the monarchy and its restoration, was elected President of the Council of Five Hundred. After documentation of Pichegru's activities was supplied by General Napoleon Bonaparte, the republican Directors accused the entire body of plotting against the Republic and moved quickly to annul the elections and arrest the royalists.

At dawn 4 September 1797, Paris was declared to be under martial law, while a decree was issued, asserting that anyone supporting royalism or the restoration of the Constitution of 1793 was to be shot without trial. To support the coup, General Lazare Hoche, then commander of the Army of Sambre-et-Meuse, arrived in the capital with his troops, while Bonaparte sent troops under Charles-Pierre Augereau. Pichegru, Dominique-Vincent Ramel-Nogaret, Barthélemy and Amédée Willot were arrested, while Lazare Carnot made good his escape. 214 deputies were arrested and 65 were subsequently exiled to Cayenne in French Guiana including Pichegru, Ramel, Barthélemy and Carnot. The election results in 49 departments were annulled. In the aftermath 160 recently returned émigrés were sentenced to death, and around 1320 priests accused of "conspiring against the Republic" were deported. The two newly vacant places in the Directory were filled by Philippe Merlin de Douai and François de Neufchâteau.

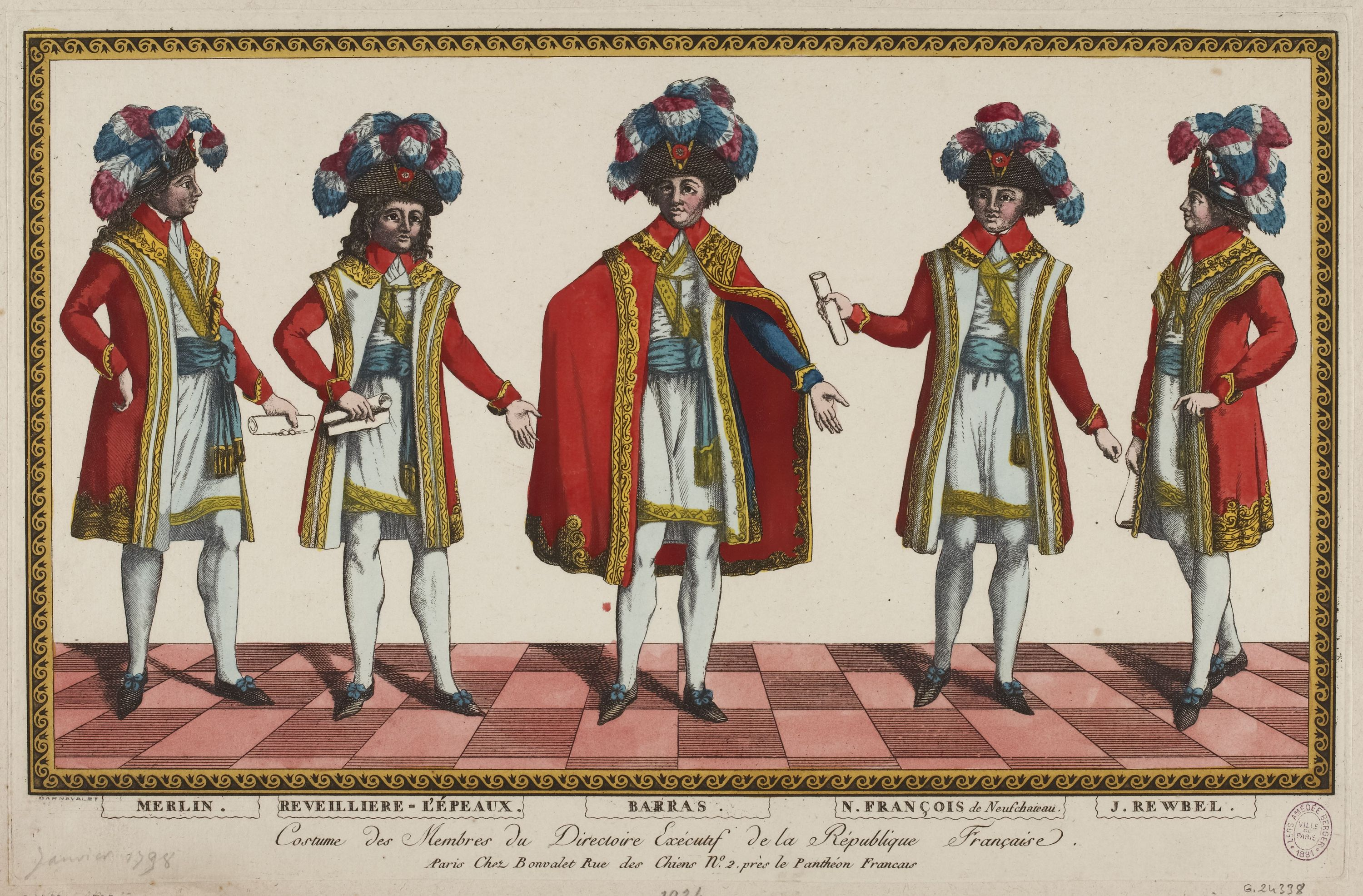
The post-coup French Directory, with the newly elected members Neufchâteau and Merlin

The 80-gun ship of the line Foudroyant was briefly named Dix-huit fructidor in after the event.
