= Army of the Coasts =

French Revolutionary Army created in 1792

The Army of the Coasts (Armée des côtes) was a French Revolutionary Army created in January 1793 under the command of Anne François Augustin de La Bourdonnaye. In April 1793 it was split into the Army of the Coasts of Cherbourg and the Army of the Coasts of Brest. The 1796 creation of the Army of the Coasts of the Ocean can be seen as its reforming into a single unit.
