= Gabriel Venance Rey =

French general (1763–1836)

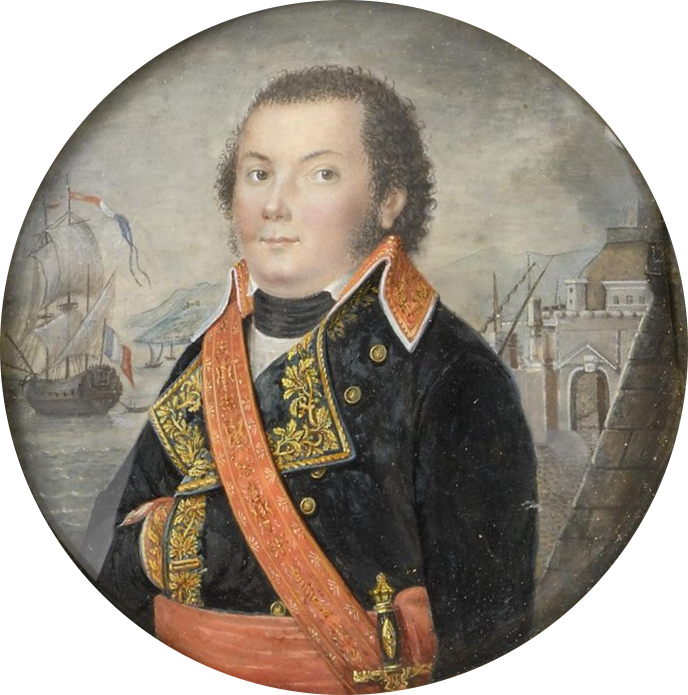
- Gabriel Venance Rey, commander of the advance guard of the Army of Naples
- Born: 24 July 1763
- Died: 20 April 1836 (aged 72)
- Allegiance: France
- Branch: Infantry
- Service years: 1791–1820
- Rank: General of Division
- Conflicts: French Revolutionary Wars; Napoleonic Wars

Gabriel Venance Rey or Antoine Gabriel Rey (24 July 1763 – 20 April 1836) was a general officer in the army of France during the French Revolutionary Wars. He led a division under Napoleon Bonaparte in the Italian campaign of 1796-1797. He later fought in Italy and retired from military service in 1820.

== War of the First Coalition ==
Born on 24 July 1763, Rey joined the old royal army of Louis XVI and became a lieutenant in 1791. He was promoted general of division of 17 July 1793. He fought in the War in the Vendée, taking command of the Army of the Coasts of Brest from Lazare Hoche on 10 September 1795. His tenure lasted until 23 December that year when he was replaced by Gabriel Marie Joseph, comte d'Hédouville.

In January 1797, his division covered the western side of Lake Garda during the fourth Austrian attempt to raise the Siege of Mantua. Summoned to the east by Bonaparte, some of his troops marched and others crossed the lake by boat to fight at the Battle of Rivoli on 14 January. Arriving in the afternoon, Rey's soldiers helped eliminate Franz Joseph, Marquis de Lusignan's isolated Austrian column south of the main battlefield. The following day, he assisted Barthélemy Joubert in mopping up the shattered Austrian army, capturing large numbers of prisoners. His 4,156-man division included the brigades of Joachim Murat, Louis Baraguey d'Hilliers, and Antoine Joseph Veaux.

== War of the Second Coalition ==
Rey's portrait identifies him as commandant of the advance guard of the Army of Naples. (Note: See portrait.) He carried out the Siege of Gaeta with 4,000 troops in 1799. Gaeta's 3,600-man Neapolitan garrison surrendered to him on 5 January 1799. Gabriel Rey retired from the army in 1820 and died on 20 April 1836.

== Notes ==
Footnotes

Citations

Military offices
Preceded by Lazare Hoche	Commander-in-chief of the Army of the Coasts of Brest; 10 September – 23 December 1795	Succeeded by Gabriel Marie Joseph, comte d'Hédouville
