= Jacques Marguerite Pilotte de La Barollière =

French general

Jacques Marguerite Pilotte de La Barollière (28 November 1746 in Lunéville – 1 December 1827 in Nîmes) was a French general under the First Republic and First Empire.
