= Auguste-Louis Petiet =

Historical French general

Baron Auguste-Louis Letiet
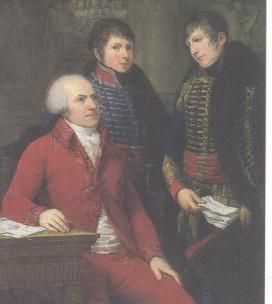
- Portrait of the Petiet family

Deputy for the 1st District of Nièvre
- In office 14 March 1852 – ✝1 August 1858

Master of Requests of the Council of State
- In office 2 May 1846 – 1852

Personal details
- Born: 3 June 1784 Rennes, Duchy of Brittany, Kingdom of France
- Died: 1 August 1858 (aged 74) Paris, Second French Empire

Military service
- Allegiance: First French Republic; First French Empire; Bourbon Restoration; July Monarchy
- Branch/service: Army
- Years of service: 1800–1814, 1815; 1816–1848

Auguste-Louis Petiet (3 June 1784 – 1 August 1858), was a French general and politician of the First French Empire.

== Biography ==
Youngest son of Claude Louis Petiet, and younger brother of Pierre François Petiet, Augustin Petiet finished his studies to enter the École Polytechnique, and was declared eligible for combat by Adrien-Marie Legendre; his father, who served with Napoleon Bonaparte (now First Consul of France) in the Army of the Reserve, took his son to battle and saw service at the Battle of Marengo.

In 1804, Petiet was commissioned as a second lieutenant (sous-lieutenant) of the 10th Hussar Regiment, but shortly after left the regiment to join Marshal Soult's Staff at the Camp of Boulogne.

During the Battle of Austerlitz, Petiet is involved in the three charges of the dragoon division, and leads his section during the capture of four guns (cannons). For his accomplishments, the Emperor decorates Petiet with the Legion of Honour (Légion de Honneur). During the Battle of Eylau, he is promoted to captain (capitaine) and is given command of a company of the 8th Hussar Regiment, and during the Battle of Friedland contributes to the defeat of a Prussian cuirassier detachment of 300 men.

Petiet takes part in the French Invasion of Portugal in 1809, and participates in the Peninsular War. At the Siege of Badajoz, he stormed the fort of Parvaleras at the head of 200 voltigeurs. A few days later he was seriously injured which charging with two squadrons of hussars, and is promoted to squadron leader (Chef d'Escadron) after the siege.

Because of the nature of his injures, Petiet is sent back to France for a short time to recover. After recovering from his injuries, Petiet is promoted to Lieutenant Colonel (Colonel en Second) of the 13th Hussar Regiment, but requests an appointment as Chef d'Escadron of the 2nd Light Cavalry Lancers Regiment of the Imperial Guard (Dutch), which Napoleon granted.

In 1812, Petiet was involved in the French Invasion of Russia, and distinguishes himself at the Battle of Krasnoi, and in the following year is raised to Officer of the Legion of Honour following his conduct at the Battle of Dresden. During the Saxon Campaign of 1813, Petiet is given command of 300 men in two composite light cavalry squadrons to make up the rear-guard of Marshal Édouard Mortier, Duke of Trévise's army corps. After weeks of raiding, the force of 300 troopers is reduced to just 55 men and arrives in Mainz by the end of the year. On arrival in Mainz, he is promoted to colonel.

On 17 January 1814, Petiet is appointed a Baron of the Empire, becoming Auguste-Louis, Baron de Petiet. During the Campaign in north-east France in mid-1814, Petiet is appointed Colonel of the Chief of Staff of the V Corps' light cavalry division. During the Battle of Nangis, his horse is killed under him and shot twice, but continues to fight off the attacking Allies. Following the engagement, Napoleon appoints him a Knight of the Order of the Iron Crown of the Kingdom of Italy.

Following the First Bourbon Restoration, the new King Louis XVIII makes Letiet a Knight of the Order of Saint Louis, and confirms his title of baron from 11 November 1814.

During the Hundred Days, Petiet rallies to the Emperor and is appointed Adjutant General of the General Staff of the Army of the North. He is subsequently promoted to General of Brigade (Général de Brigade), as he lost his rank during the First Restoration. Carrying orders from the Emperor, his hors is slain under him and injured, and is therefore absent from any action during the Hundred Days.

During the Second Restoration, Petiet is removed from the Army List and forced to leave the army. In 1823, he re-joined the Army as Director of the Historical Archives of the Ministry of War, a post he kept until 1830. In 1830, he left his position as director and took part in the French conquest of Algeria on the staff of Louis Auguste Victor de Ghaisne, Comte de Bourmont. During the Siege of Bordj Moulay Hassan Fortress, his horse is killed, though continues to storm the fortress leading his brigade into the breech.

On his return from Algeria, Petiet was promoted to Maréchal de Camp, from which was deprived by the Bourbons for 15 years, and subsequently appointed Commander of Hérault (1831–1833), and suppressed several riots. In 1833, he became commander of Loiret. In 1846, he became a member of the Cavalry Staff Committee and soon after became part of the Council of State as Master of Requests, and subsequently became a Grand Officer of the Legion of Honour on 2 May 1846.

In 1848, Petiet retired, and supported Louis-Napoleon's return, and subsequently elected during the 1848 French Constituent Assembly election as a member of the Bonapartists for the 1st District of Nièvre. During the 1852 French legislative election, he was re-elected as a member of the Bonapartists.

In 1854, Petiet was promoted to General Councillor of Nièvre, and was re-elected as a deputy during the 1857 French legislative election, still as a member of the Bonapartists.

On 1 August 1858, Petiet died from natural causes, and was replaced on 21 November by de Montjoeaux as member for Nièvre.
