= Anne François Augustin de La Bourdonnaye =

- Born: 18 July 1745; Guérande, France
- Died: 6 October 1793 (aged 48) Dax, Landes, France
- Allegiance: Kingdom of France; France
- Branch: Infantry, Cavalry
- Service years: (Kingdom of France) 1761–1792 (France) 1792–1793
- Rank: General of Division
- Commands: Army of the Interior; Army of the Coasts; Army of the Western Pyrenees
- Conflicts: Seven Years' War; Battle of Villinghausen; War of the First Coalition; Siege of Lille; Capture of Antwerp; War in the Vendée; War of the Pyrenees; Battle of the Bidassoa

Anne François Augustin de La Bourdonnaye (18 July 1745 – 6 October 1793) briefly commanded three armies during the early years of the War of the First Coalition. An aristocrat, he joined the French Royal Army as a cadet during the Seven Years' War and fought at Villinghausen. He rose through the ranks until he became a maréchal de camp (brigadier general) in 1788 and a lieutenant general in 1792. During the Valmy Campaign he was responsible for defending the northeast frontier. He led the short-lived Army of the Interior in September 1792 before taking charge of the Army of the Coasts for two and a half months in early 1793. He transferred to the Pyrenees front and became the interim commander of the Army of the Western Pyrenees in July 1793 before becoming ill and dying a few months later.

Military offices
Preceded by New organization	Commander-in-chief of the Army of the Interior; 4–22 September 1792	Succeeded by Disbanded
Preceded by New organization	Commander-in-chief of the Army of the Coasts; 31 January–14 April 1793	Succeeded by Jean Baptiste Camille Canclaux
Preceded by Joseph Marie Servan de Gerbey	Interim Commander-in-chief of the Army of the Western Pyrenees; 5–10 July 1793	Succeeded by Pierre Joseph du Chambge d'Elbecq
