= Lazare Hoche =

French Army officer and politician (1768–1797)

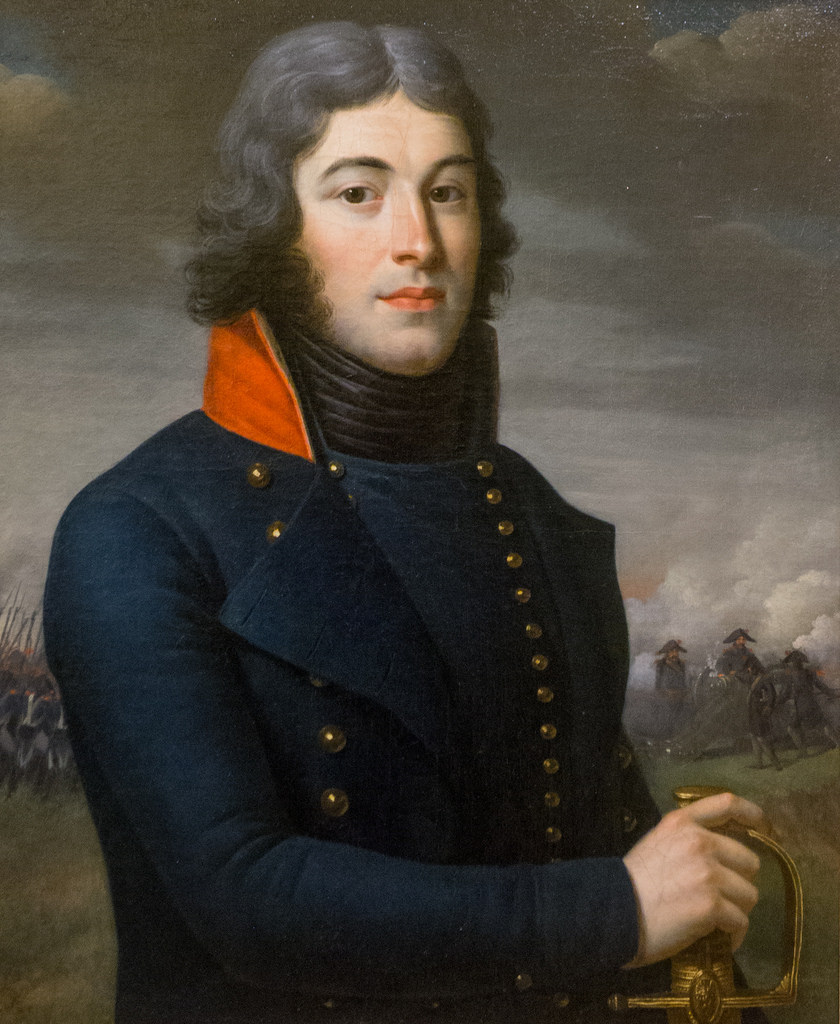
- Portrait by Jean-Louis Laneuville, c. 1801
- Born: 24 June 1768; Montreuil, France
- Died: 19 September 1797 (aged 29); Wetzlar, Holy Roman Empire
- Military career
- Allegiance: Kingdom of France; French Republic
- Branch: French Royal Army; French Revolutionary Army
- Service years: 1784–1797
- Rank: Divisional general
- Commands: Army of Moselle; Army of the Rhine; Army of the Coasts of Cherbourg; Army of the Coasts of Brest; Army of the West; Army of the Coasts of the Ocean; Army of Sambre and Meuse
- Conflicts: See list: French Revolutionary Wars; Flanders campaign; War in the Vendée; Invasion of France (1795); Chouannerie; French expedition to Ireland (1796); Battle of Biesingen; Battle of Kaiserslautern; Battle of Froeschwiller (1793); Second Battle of Wissembourg; Battle of Neuwied (1797)

Divisional-General Louis Lazare Hoche (English: /ˈɒʃ/ OSH, French: [lwi lazaʁ ɔʃ]; 24 June 1768 – 19 September 1797) was a French Army officer and politician who served as the Minister of War in 1797. He enlisted in the French Royal Army's French Guards Regiment in 1784, and joined the National Guard in 1789 following the beginning the French Revolution. Hoche was commissioned as an officer in 1792, and successively served in the Flanders campaign, War in the Vendée and Chouannerie along with several other engagements. The British historian Richard Holmes described Hoche as "quick-thinking, stern, and ruthless... a general of real talent whose early death was a loss to France."

== Early life ==
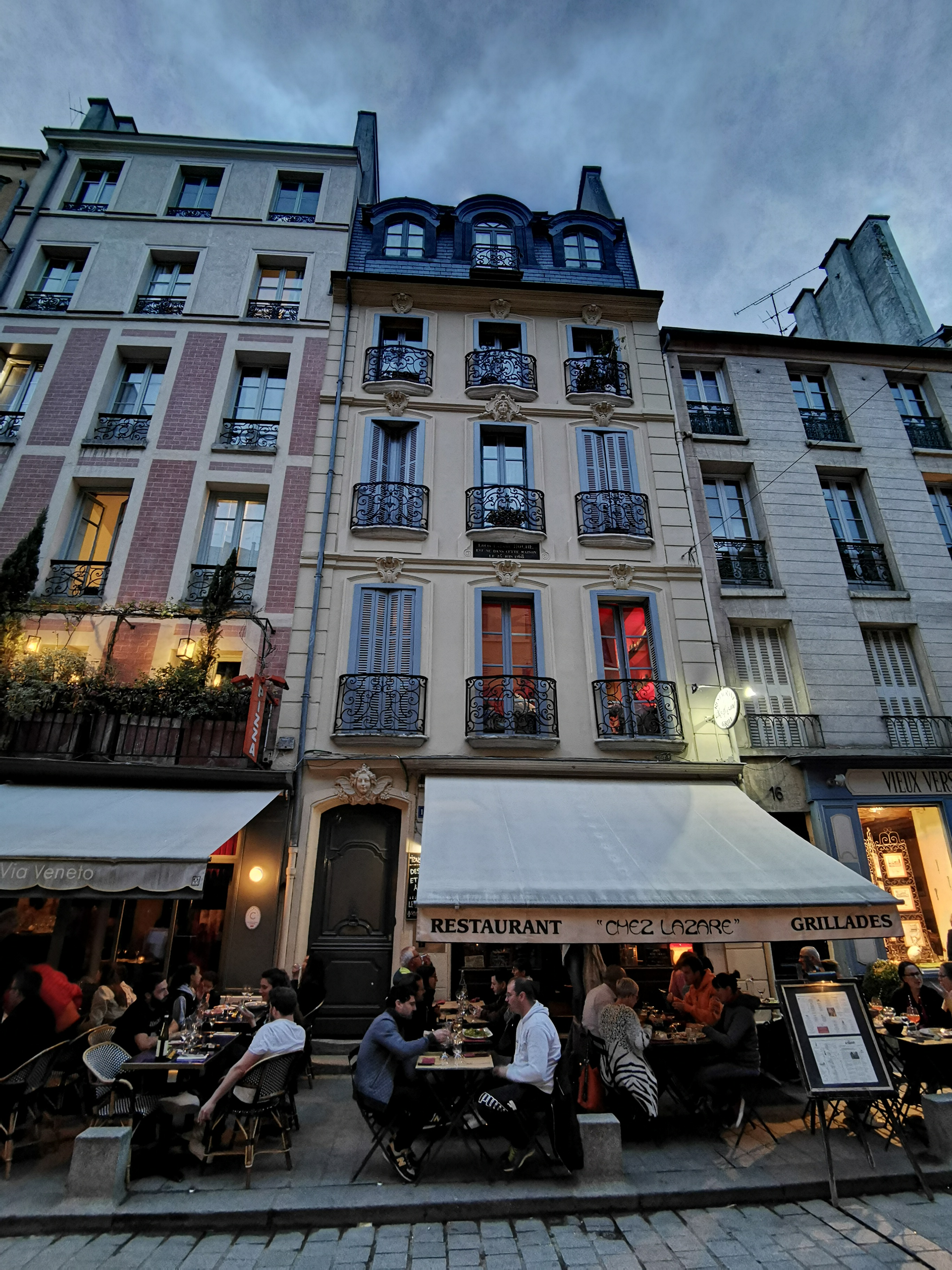
Hoche's birthplace

Lazare Hoche was born on 24 June 1768 in the village of Montreuil, today part of Versailles, to Anne Merlière and Louis Hoche, a groom at the royal hunting grounds. His mother died when he was two years old, and Hoche was mostly raised by an aunt, who was a fruit-seller in Montreuil, and was educated by his maternal uncle, the parish priest of Saint-Germain-en-Laye, who arranged for Hoche to become a choirboy at his church.

In 1782, Hoche began working as an aide at the royal stables, but soon left in order to join the French Royal Army. He enlisted in the French Guards Regiment as a fusilier in October 1784, although he originally intended to serve with the colonial troops in the East Indies. He was promoted to grenadier in November 1785 then to corporal in May 1789, just before the outbreak of the French Revolution.

After the French Guards were disbanded at the start of the Revolution, Hoche joined the new National Guard in September 1789. During the October Days protests, he was among the Guardsmen under the command of the Marquis de Lafayette who escorted King Louis XVI and his family out of the Palace of Versailles. He thereafter served in various line infantry regiments until he received a commission in 1792.

== French Revolutionary Wars ==
=== Flanders campaign ===
Hoche first saw action in the defence of Thionville in 1792, as a lieutenant, in the early stages of the Flanders campaign of the Revolutionary Wars, and took part in the Siege of Namur at the end of the year. After serving with distinction in the Siege of Maastricht, Hoche became an aide-de-camp to General Le Veneur in March 1793, and further distinguished himself later that month at the Battle of Neerwinden.

When Charles Dumouriez defected to the Austrians, Hoche, along with Le Veneur and others, fell under suspicion of treason. After being kept under arrest from 8 to 20 August, he took part in the successful defence of Dunkirk, for which he was promoted successively to colonel and brigade general in September, and to general of division in October 1793. In November, Hoche was provisionally appointed to command the Army of the Moselle, and within a few weeks he was in the field at the head of his army in Lorraine. His first battle was that of Kaiserslautern during 28–30 November 1793 against the Prussians. The French were defeated, but even in the midst of the Reign of Terror the Committee of Public Safety retained Hoche in his command. In their eyes, pertinacity and fiery energy outweighed everything else, and Hoche soon showed that he possessed these qualities.

On 22 December 1793 he won the Battle of Froeschwiller, and the representatives on mission with his army at once added the Army of the Rhine to his sphere of command. In the Second Battle of Wissembourg on 26 December 1793, the French under his command drove Dagobert Sigmund von Wurmser's Austrian army from Alsace. Hoche pursued his success, sweeping the enemy before him to the middle Rhine in four days. He then put his troops into winter quarters at Bouzonville.

=== Arrest ===
Before the next campaign opened, Hoche married Anne Adelaïde Dechaux at Thionville on 11 March 1794. The day before his marriage, he had been invited to command the Army of Italy. However, upon arriving in Nice to receive the assignment, he was arrested on orders of the Committee of Public Safety, charges of treason having been proffered by Charles Pichegru, the displaced commander of the Army of the Rhine. He was sent to Paris' Carmes Prison on 11 April, was later transferred to the Conciergerie, and was only released on 4 August, after the fall of Maximilien Robespierre and the end of the Reign of Terror.

=== War in the Vendée and Chouannerie ===
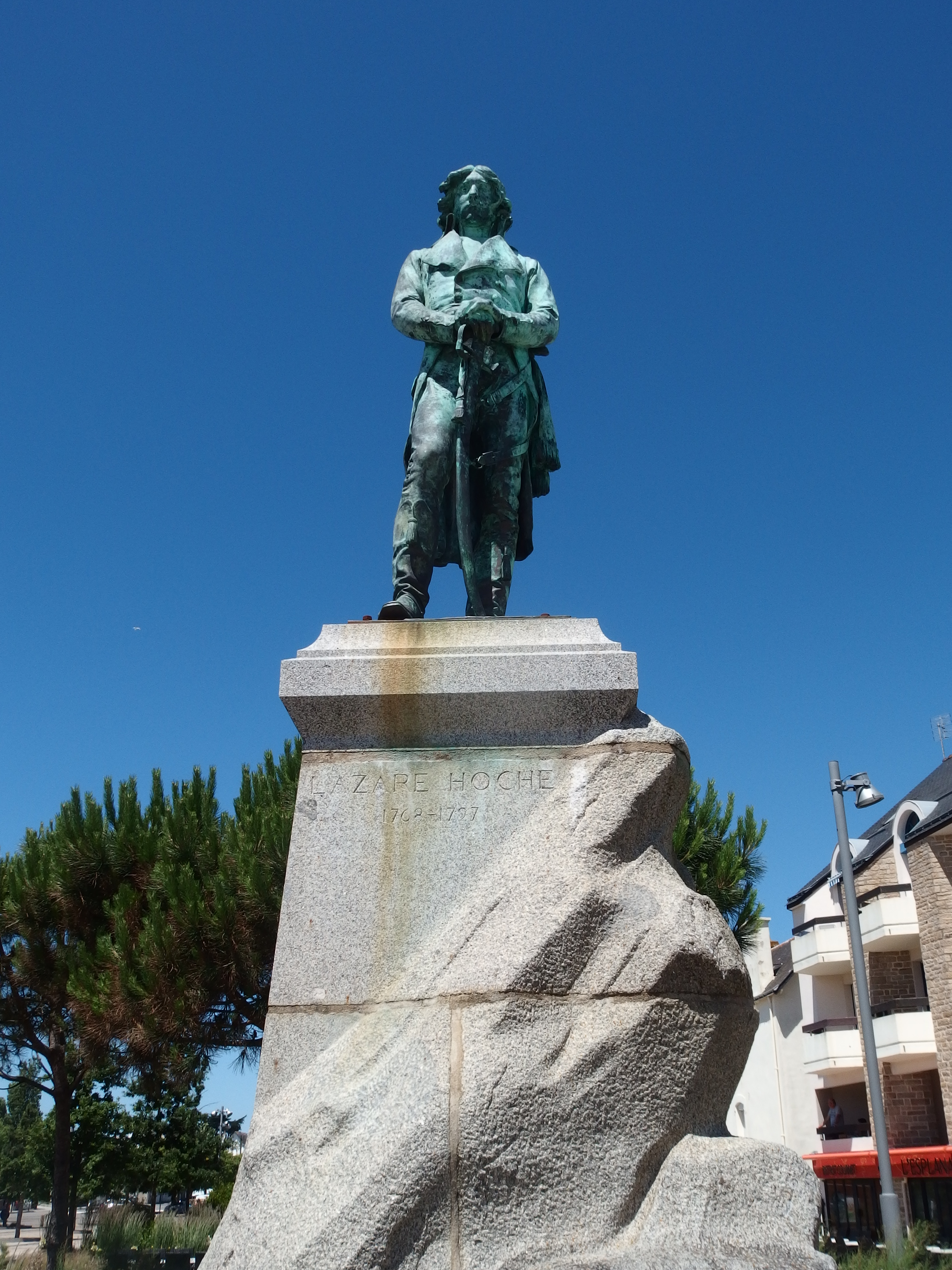
1902 statue by Jules Dalou commemorating Hoche's victory in Quiberon

Shortly after his release, Hoche was given the command of the Army of the Coasts of Cherbourg with the mission of suppressing the Royalist Revolt in the Vendée. He set up his headquarters at Rennes, Brittany, and put his initial effort into reorganizing the troops. In addition, he received the command of the Army of the Coasts of Brest in November 1794. Hoche completed the work of his predecessors in a few months by the Treaty of La Jaunaye (15 February 1795), but soon afterwards the war was renewed by the rebel leadership.

Between June and July 1795, Hoche commanded the defence of Quiberon against an invasion by the Armée des Émigrés, who were assisted by the Royal Navy. He decisively defeated the Royalist invaders at Fort Penthièvre on 21 July. In late August, he was appointed commander of the Army of the West with the order to "act offensively against Charette's army". In December 1795, when the three armies previously under his command (Armies of the West, of the Coasts of Brest and of the Coasts of Cherbourg) merged to form the new Army of the Coasts of the Ocean, Hoche became the supreme commander of all Republican forces in Western France.

Thereafter, by means of mobile columns (which he kept under good discipline), he gradually eliminated the Catholic and Royal Armies. Hoche directed the operations that led to the capture (and subsequent execution) of rebel leaders Jean-Nicolas Stofflet (24 February 1796) and François de Charette (23 March), bringing an end to the War in the Vendée. With the surrender of the leaders of the Chouannerie, in May and June 1796, Hoche concluded the pacification of Western France, which had for more than three years been the scene of civil war.

=== Expedition to Ireland ===
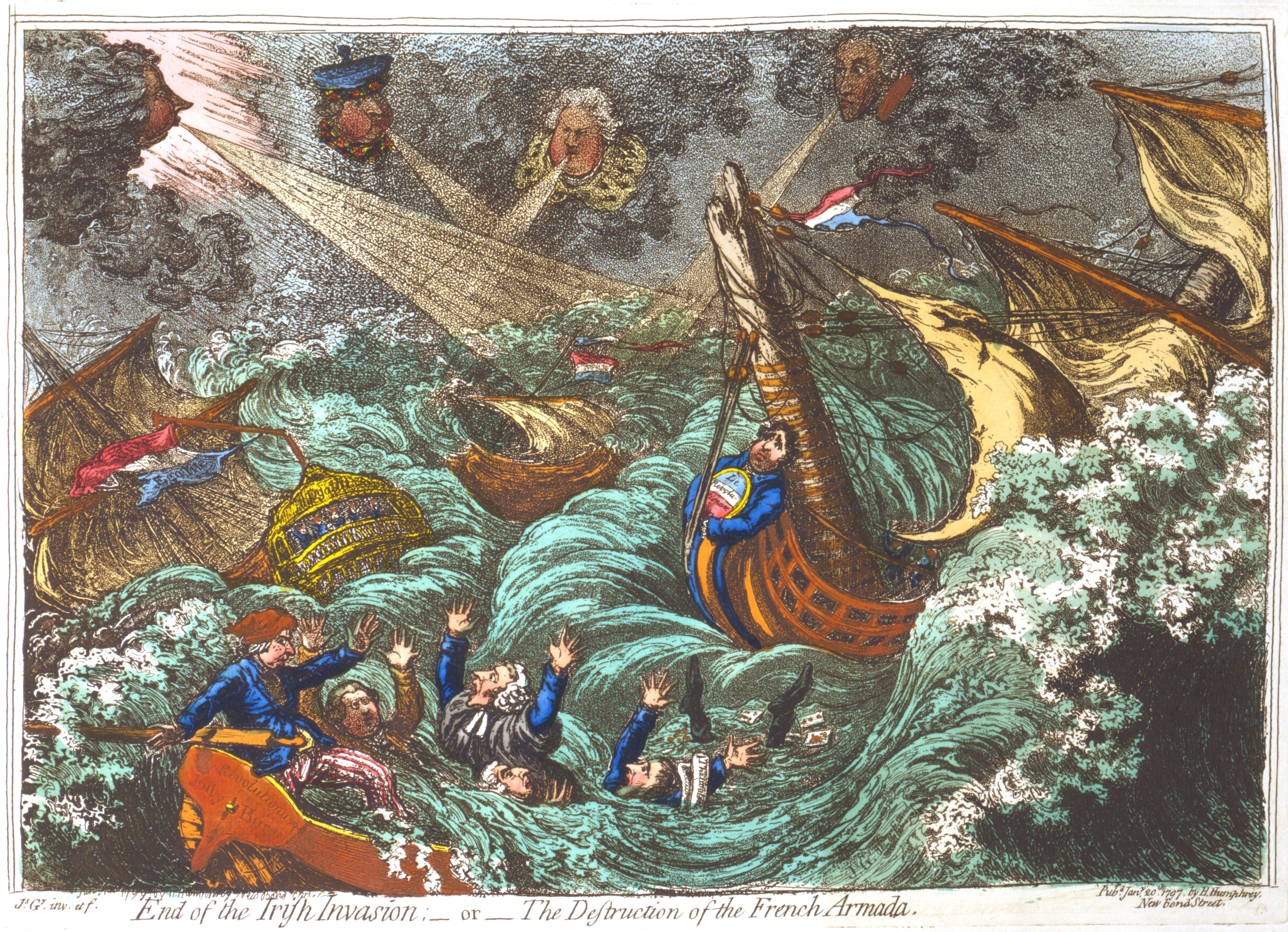
Cartoon by James Gillray mocking the failure of Hoche's expedition to Ireland

On 20 July 1796, Hoche was rewarded by the French Directory for his immense service. That same day, he was appointed to organize and command the French expedition to Ireland, to assist the Society of United Irishmen in a rebellion against British rule. He survived an assassination attempt in Rennes on 16 October, when a worker at the local arsenal fired at him but missed.

In Brest, Hoche gathered between 12,000 and 25,000 troops and 44 vessels for the expedition, the latter of which were under the command of Vice-admiral Justin Bonaventure Morard de Galles. The fleet set sail for Ireland on 15 December 1796, with Hoche and Morard de Galles aboard the frigate Fraternité. Due to a gale Fraternité was separated from the expedition the day after its departure, and was afterwards chased by a British warship. By the time it reached the Irish coast, on 30 December, the rest of expedition had already dispersed after a failed landing attempt at Bantry Bay. Fraternité returned to the Île de Ré on 11 January 1797.

With the United Irishmen leader Wolfe Tone, who was to have landed with him in Ireland, Hoche reflected critically on the violent course of the Revolution. Tone, "heartily glad" to find Hoche of "a humane temperament", wrote in his memoirs:

Hoche mentioned, also, that great mischief had been done to the principles of liberty and additional difficulties thrown in the way of the French Revolution, by the quantity of blood spilled: "for", he added, "if you guillotine a man, you get rid of an individual, it is true, but then you make all his friends and connections enemies for ever of the government".

=== Rhine frontier and death ===
On his return, Hoche was at once transferred to the Rhine frontier as commander of the Army of Sambre and Meuse, where he defeated the Austrians at the Battle of Neuwied on 18 April 1797, though operations were soon afterwards brought to an end by the Preliminaries of Leoben. In July 1797, Hoche was appointed the Minister of War by the Directory. In this position he was surrounded by obscure political intrigues, and, finding himself the dupe of Paul Barras and technically guilty of violating the constitution, he resigned after less than a month in office, and returned to his command on the Rhine frontier. It was his denunciation during that time that had led to Kléber's removal from command. The compromising letter was found by Jean Baptiste Alexandre Strolz in Hoche's papers.

=== Death and legacy ===
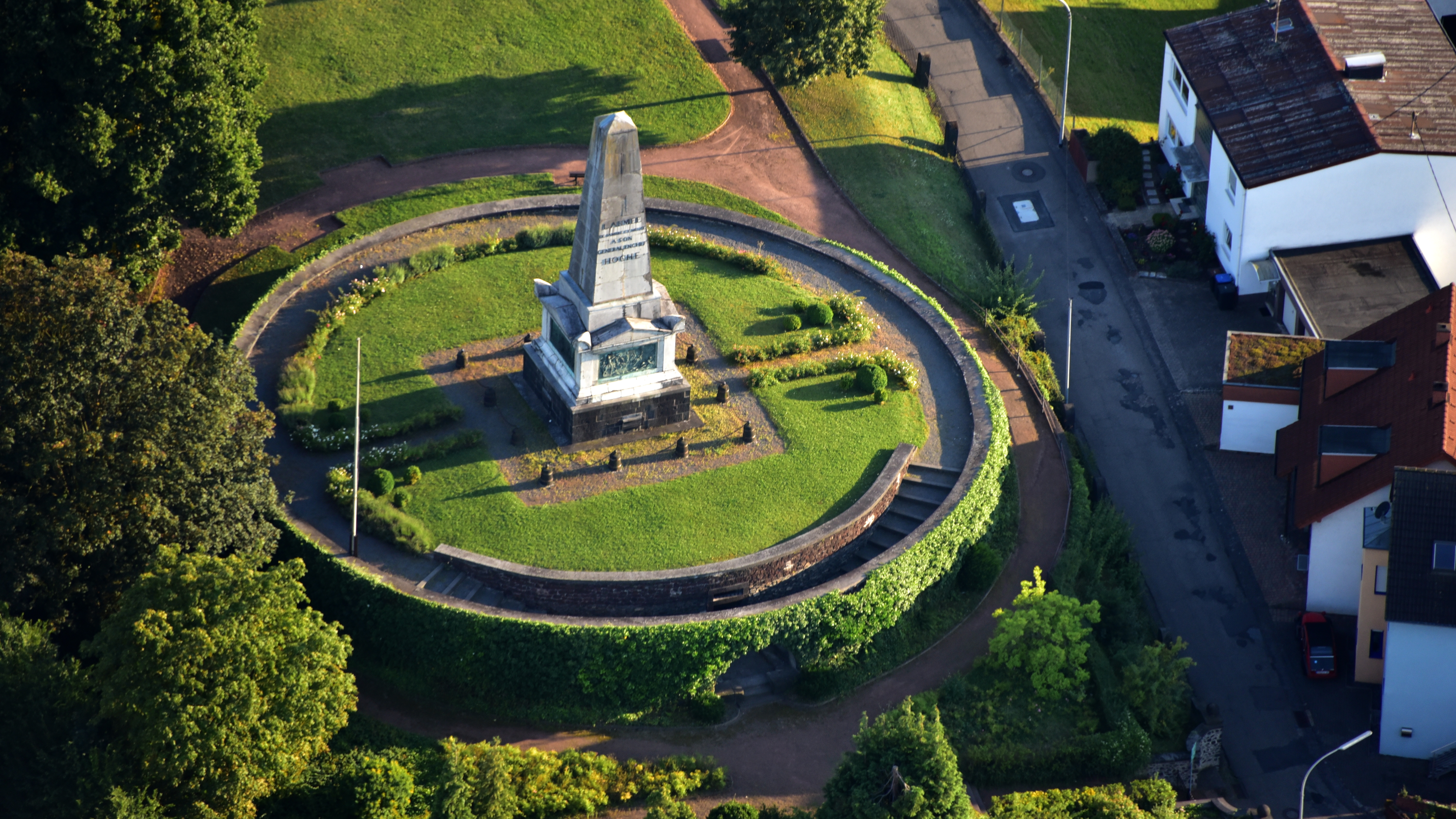
Monument to Hoche in Weißenthurm

On 2 September, Hoche received the command of the Army of the Rhine and Moselle and set up his headquarters at Wetzlar, near Koblenz. Following his return from Frankfurt, on 13 September, his health grew rapidly worse, and he died at Wetzlar on 19 September of consumption (tuberculosis), aged 29. The belief spread that he had been poisoned, but the suspicion seems to have been unfounded. He was buried four days later next to his friend François Marceau at Fort Petersberg in Koblenz.

A funeral procession to Hoche was held on the Champ de Mars, Paris on 1 October. In 1919, the French Army in occupied Rhineland reburied his mortal remains into the 1797-built Monument General Hoche in Weißenthurm, near Neuwied, where he had started his last campaign against the Austrians. Hoche is commemorated by a statue on Place Hoche, a gardened square not far from the main entrance to the Palace of Versailles, and another in the Louvre Palace. Another statue, the last major work by Jules Dalou, is in Quiberon, Brittany. In Les Invalides there is also a memorial to Hoche. A station on the Paris Metro is also called Hoche. The French Navy named the ironclad Hoche after him. Hoche's motto was Res non verba, which is Latin for "Deeds, not words".

== Sources ==
- Clerget, Charles (1905). Tableaux des Armées Françaises pendant les Guerres de la Révolution. Paris: Librarie Militaire R. Chapelot et Cie.

Military offices
Preceded by Jacques Charles René Delaunay	Commander-in-chief of the Army of the Moselle; 31 October 1793 – 18 March 1794	Succeeded by Jean-Baptiste Jourdan
Preceded by Pierre Vialle	Commander-in-chief of the Army of the Coasts of Cherbourg; 1 September 1794 – 30 April 1795	Succeeded by Jean-Baptiste Annibal Aubert du Bayet
Preceded by Thomas-Alexandre Dumas	Commander-in-chief of the Army of the Coasts of Brest; 10 November 1794 – 10 September 1795	Succeeded by Gabriel Venance Rey
Preceded by Jean Baptiste Camille Canclaux	Commander-in-chief of the Army of the West; 11 September – 17 December 1795	Succeeded by Amédée Willot
Preceded by New organization	Commander-in-chief of the Army of the Coasts of the Ocean; 5 January – 22 September 1796	Succeeded by Discontinued
Preceded by New organization	Commander-in-chief of the Army of Ireland; 1 November – 23 December 1796	Succeeded by Emmanuel Grouchy
Preceded by Emmanuel Grouchy	Commander-in-chief of the Army of Ireland; 19 January – 9 February 1797	Succeeded by Discontinued
Preceded by Jean Victor Marie Moreau	Commander-in-chief of the Army of Sambre-et-Meuse; 9 February – 18 September 1797	Succeeded by François Joseph Lefebvre
Political offices
Preceded by Claude Louis Petiet	French minister of War; 15 July 1797 – 22 July 1797	Succeeded by Barthélemy Louis Joseph Schérer
