= Jean-François-Auguste Moulin =

French general (1752–1810)

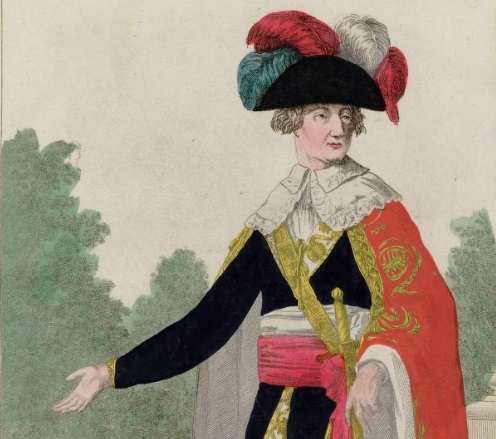
Portrait of Moulin at the Bibliothèque nationale de France

Jean-François-Auguste Moulin^{1} (French pronunciation: [ʒɑ̃ fʁɑ̃swa oɡyst mulɛ̃]; 14 March 1752 – 12 March 1810) was a general of the French Revolution and member of the French Directory. He had a long career as a military officer serving France in the Royal Army of King Louis XVI, the Garde Nationale of the French Revolution, and the Grande Armée of Napoleon Bonaparte.

== Early life and military career ==
Moulin was born in Caen, Calvados. In his youth he was educated at the Collège des Jésuites at Caen, eventually taking employment as an engineer. He briefly joined an infantry regiment in Brittany, and then found employment as a geographer until 1788. When the Revolution began in 1789, he volunteered for the Paris National Guard. His pro-revolutionary sentiment developed into a solid political affiliation, and he became widely considered a steady and reliable member of the Jacobins.

Moulin served the French First Republic as a general during the French Revolutionary Wars. Promoted to adjutant major in 1791, he rapidly advanced to the position of divisional general by 1793. He commanded Republican forces during the war in the Vendée, and served with distinction at the Battle of Saumur.

== Member of the Directory ==
Although he was not a figure of national stature, Moulin was nonetheless elevated to the French executive branch of government by fortuitous circumstances. He happened to be in the capital with his army at a critical moment of political upheaval, the Coup of 30 Prairial Year VII. Presented as an acceptable alternative to the Directors who were purged in the coup, Moulin was supported by his friend the vicomte de Barras, and he was appointed to the Directory in June 1799.

Moulin did not remain in office for very long. With his appointment – and the simultaneous elevation of Roger Ducos, a Council deputy supported by the Abbé Sieyès – the Directory assumed its final incarnation. Moulin, Ducos, Barras, Sieyès, and Louis-Jérôme Gohier led the Directory until its dissolution after the coup d'état of 18 Brumaire.

When the coup d'état occurred, the senior member Barras submitted and the Directory officially resigned. Moulin strongly protested the abrogation of the Directory's powers by the ascendant supporters of Napoleon Bonaparte, but his efforts were ignored. Moulin and Gohier were held prisoners by troops led by General Jean Victor Marie Moreau until the two signed papers of resignation (10 November 1799).

== Later life ==
Moulin eventually became reconciled to Napoleon and returned to military life as a commander in the Grande Armée. He served for several years in the Napoleonic Wars until his health began to decline and he returned to France. He died in Pierrefitte, Seine, on 12 March 1810.

== Notes ==
- ^ 1: The surname is sometimes spelled Moulins.

== Bibliography ==
- Aulard, François-Alphonse (1910). The French Revolution: A Political History, 1789–1804 (Volume III: The Revolutionary government, 1793–1797). New York: Charles Scribner's Sons. p. 361.
- Robert, Adolphe; Cougny, Gaston (1889–1891). Dictionary of French Parliamentarians from 1789 to 1889 (PDF) (in French). Vol. 04. Paris: Edgar Bourloton.
- Lefebvre, Georges; Soboul, Albert (1962). The Directory. London: Routledge and Kegan Paul. OCLC 668426465.
- Soboul, Albert (1975). The French Revolution 1787–1799. New York: Vintage. ISBN 0-394-71220-X.
