= Charles Clerget =

French army officer

Charles Clerget was a French army officer born in Langres on 8 October 1795, died in Paris on 16 March 1849 (53 years old). He is known for publishing the Tableaux of the Armies of the French Revolution.

== Biography ==
He entered the École Polytechnique on 1 November 1815, but was dismissed on 13 April 1816. He then studied at the Artillery School of Metz. He entered this school on 23 January 1819. After internships to Cuirassiers of the Queen, the 8th Line Infantry Regiment, 2nd Infantry Regiment of the Guard and the 1st regiment of foot artillery, he was commissioned as a lieutenant on 12 November 1824.

From 1 April 1825, he was employed in the work of the mapping of France, and was promoted to captain on 27 October 1830 at the 53rd Infantry Regiment. From 10 April 1839, he remained at the war depository, where he remained an almost uninterrupted assignment until his death. He devoted himself to the classification and study of the Archives of the Wars of the French Revolution and the Empire. He was promoted to squadron leader on 10 July 1848. Named Chevalier of the Legion of Honor on 9 January 1848, and the officer on 24 October 1848, he died in Paris on 16 March 1849.

== Publications ==
Tables of French armies during the Revolutionary wars, military bookstore R. Chapelot, Paris, 1905
