= Paul Petiet =

French adjutant-general

Paul Petiet (24 July 1770, in Châtillon-sur-Seine – 20 December 1849, in Limoux) was a French adjutant-general during the Napoleonic Wars.
