= Gabriel, comte d'Hédouville =

French Army officer and diplomat (1755–1825)

Gabriel d'Hédouville
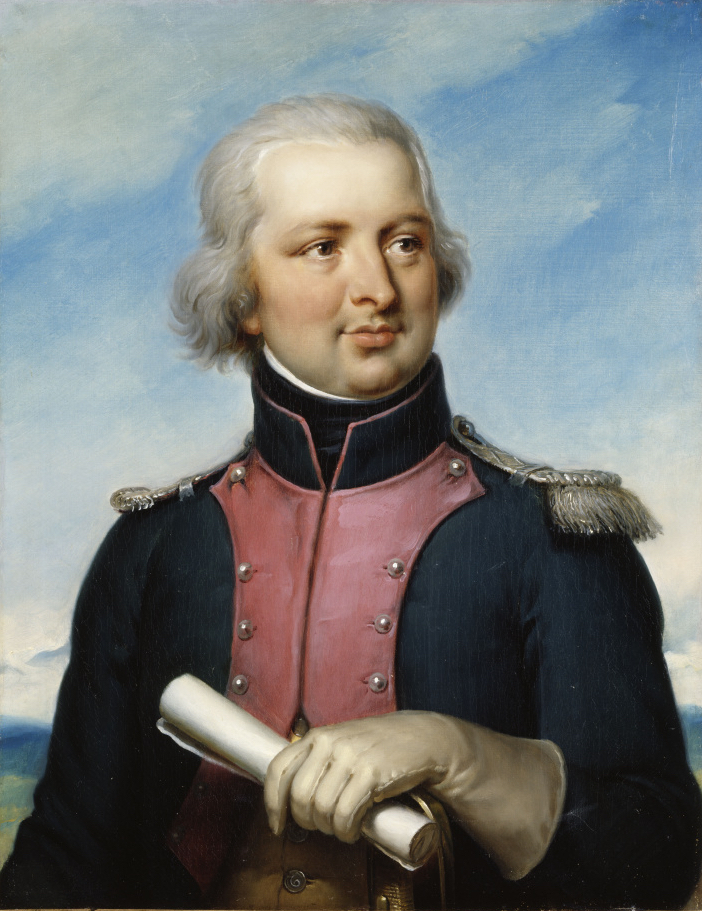
- Portrait by Jean-Baptiste Paulin Guérin, 1835
- Born: 27 July 1755; Laon, France
- Died: 30 March 1825 (aged 69) Brétigny-sur-Orge, France
- Allegiance: Kingdom of France; French First Republic; First French Empire
- Branch: French Royal Army; French Revolutionary Army; French Imperial Army
- Rank: Divisional general
- Conflicts: French Revolutionary Wars; Battle of Valmy; Battle of Kaiserslautern
- Other work: Diplomat

Divisional-General Gabriel-Marie-Théodore-Joseph, comte d'Hédouville (27 July 1755 – 30 March 1825) was a French Army officer and diplomat.

== Life ==
=== Early life ===
A student at the royal collège at La Flèche, he became a lieutenant in 1788 and rose to adjutant-general and lieutenant-colonel in 1792. He fought at the Battle of Valmy on 20 September 1792 and was made general de brigade and chief of staff to the Army of Moselle the following March. He then distinguished himself at the Battle of Kaiserslautern. However, he was then suspended and imprisoned as a noble and thus as a suspect, but was freed on 9 Thermidor year II (27 July 1794), brought back into the army at the rank of general of brigade and sent to the Army of the Coasts of Cherbourg (then at Brest). He became general of division in November 1795 and the Cherbourg army's chief of staff in January 1795, under Lazare Hoche. Under Hoche's orders he carried out a policy of pacification and appeasement in the west, which had revolted against the Republican regime.

He temporarily commanded the Army of the Coasts of the Ocean in place of Hoche from 10 July to mid-August 1796.

=== Saint-Domingue ===
He served on Saint-Domingue in 1798, where he had been sent as governor during Sonthonax's second commission. He encouraged the dissension between André Rigaud and Toussaint Louverture which helped to fuel the War of Knives. Toussaint's military leadership during the Haitian Revolution resulted in the rebellious slaves gaining the upper hand and restoring most of Saint-Domingue to France. Now that he ruled the island, Toussaint did not wish to surrender power to France and continued to effectively rule the country autonomously. Hédouville was one of the rivals to power whom Toussaint had to overcome. Hédouville was eventually forced to flee. However, before he left, he released André Rigaud from Toussaint's leadership.

=== Consulate to Restoration ===
Following his return from Saint-Domingue, Hédouville was appointed as commander-in-chief of the Army of England on 15 November 1799 before replacing Hoche as commander-in-chief of the Army of the West on 16 January 1800. In the role, Hédouville again negotiated a peace settlement with French royalists and was appointed as the French Consulate's minister plenipotentiary at Saint Petersburg from 1801 to 1804, when Alexander I of Russia broke relations with France. Hédouville left Saint Petersburg on 7 June 1804, and 1 February 1805 he became a member of the Sénat conservateur and was ennobled as a Count of the Empire. A monarchist at heart, he enthusiastically supported the Bourbon Restoration in France in 1814.
