= Jean-Baptiste Annibal Aubert du Bayet =

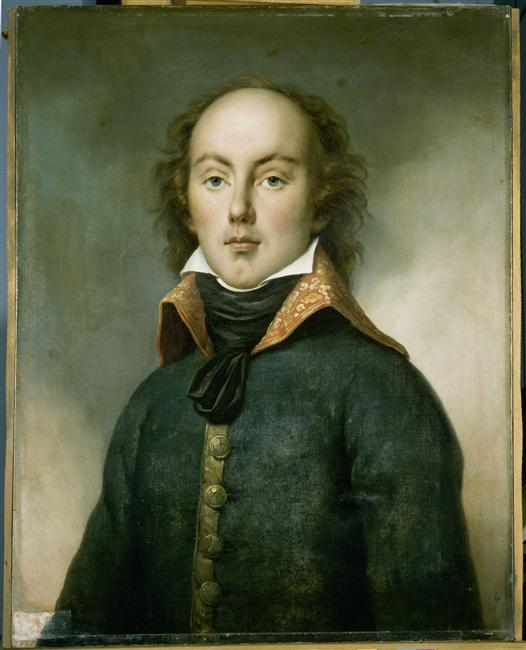
A portrait of Aubert by Jean-Baptiste Paulin Guérin

Jean-Baptiste Annibal Aubert du Bayet (19 August 1759 – 17 December 1797) was a French Army officer, politician and diplomat active during the French Revolution. Born in Baton Rouge, Louisiana in 1759, he fought in the American Revolutionary War and the French Revolutionary Wars.

== French revolution ==
Aubert du Bayet arrived in France at the beginning of the Revolution, but was initially hostile to revolutionary ideas. While in Metz, as a young Captain, he published an anti-Jewish pamphlet entitled Le cri du citoyen contre les Juifs. However, he soon saw that it could serve his ambitions. He became a member of the legislature in 1791. Aubert du Bayet was President of the French National Assembly (the "Legislative Assembly") from 8 July 1792 to 22 July 1792.

In 1793, he served as General of Brigade in the heroic defense of Mayence in 1793, when he finally had to surrender to the Prussian Army. He then seconded Hoche in Vendée in the fight against the Chouans in the War in the Vendée. He then became Minister of Defense of France ("Minister of War") from 3 November 1795 to 8 February 1796.

== Ambassador to the Ottoman Empire ==
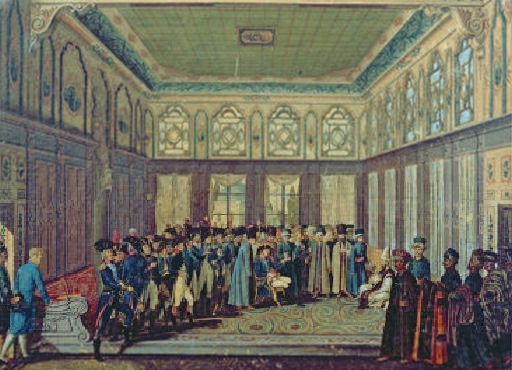
General Aubert du Bayet with his Military Mission being received by the Ottoman Grand Vizier in Constantinople in 1796, by Antoine-Laurent Castellan.

In 1796, General Aubert du Bayet was appointed as ambassador ("Minister of the Republic") to the Ottoman Empire. He was sent to the Ottoman court with artillery equipment, and French artillerymen and engineers to help with the development of the Ottoman arsenals and foundries. Infantry and cavalry officers were also to train the Spahis and Janissaries, but they were frustrated by the opposition of the Janissaries. Ironically, some of these troops, trained to Western methods, were successfully employed against the French troops of Napoleon a few years later under Sir Sydney Smith at the Siege of Saint-Jean d'Acre in 1799. Their behaviour delighted Selim III, and upon their return, they were named Nizam-gedittes or "New Regulars", but they were eventually slaughtered and dispersed by the Janissaries and conservative clerics and politicians, leading to the deposition of Selim III.

Aubert du Bayet died of fever in 1797 while in Constantinople. His widow returned to France and married to his long-time assistant Jean-François Carra de Saint-Cyr.

== See also ==
- Franco-Ottoman alliance

== Notes ==
Political offices
Preceded by Jean Baptiste Noël Bouchotte	French Minister of War; 1795–1796	Succeeded by Claude Louis Petiet
Diplomatic posts
Preceded by Charles Louis Huguet (in name only)	French Ambassador to the Ottoman Empire; 1796–1797	Succeeded by Guillaume Marie Anne Brune (after 5 years)
