= Paul Barras =

French politician, nobleman and military officer (1755-1829)

Vicomte de Barras Paul François Jean Nicolas
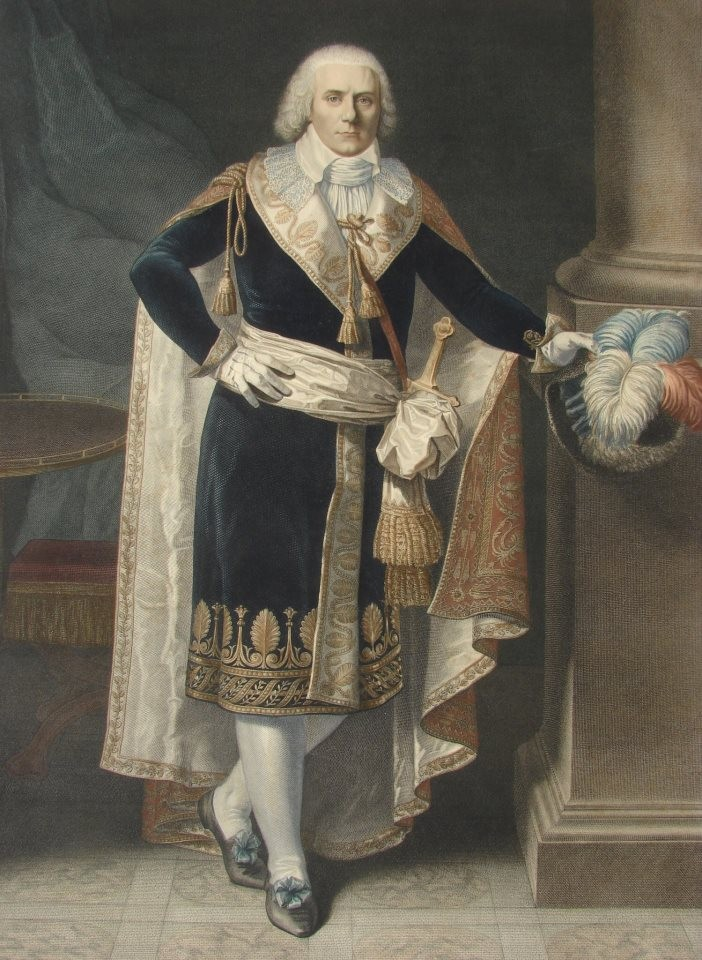
- Colored engraving by Pierre Alexandre Tardieu after a drawing by Hilaire Ledru, 1798

President of the Directory
- In office 26 November 1798 – 26 May 1799
- Preceded by: Jean-François Reubell
- Succeeded by: Philippe-Antoine Merlin
- In office 4 December 1797 – 25 February 1798
- Preceded by: Louis-Marie de La Révellière-Lépeaux
- Succeeded by: Philippe-Antoine Merlin

Member of the Directory
- In office 2 November 1795 – 10 November 1799
- Preceded by: Office created (preceded by the President of the Committee of Public Safety De Cambacérès)
- Succeeded by: Office abolished (succeeded by the First Consul Napoleon Bonaparte)

President of the National Convention
- In office 4 February 1795 – 19 February 1795
- Preceded by: Stanislas Joseph François Xavier Rovère
- Succeeded by: François Louis Bourdon

Member of the National Convention
- In office 20 September 1792 – 10 November 1795
- Constituency: Var

Director of the Directory
- In office 2 November 1795 – 9 November 1799 Serving with Louis-Marie de la Révellière, Roger Ducos, Jean-François Rewbell, Emmanuel Joseph Sieyès, Lazare Carnot, Phillipe Antoine Merlin, Jean-François Moulin, Étienne-François Letourneur, François Barthélemy, François de Neufchâteau, Jean Baptiste Treilhard and Louis-Jérôme Gohier

Personal details
- Born: Paul François Jean Nicolas; 30 June 1755 Fox-Amphoux, France
- Died: 29 January 1829 (aged 73) Chaillot (present-day Paris), France
- Resting place: Père Lachaise Cemetery
- Party: The Mountain (1792–1794); Thermidorian (1794–1799)
- Spouse: Unknown wife (left)
- Domestic partner(s): Sophie Arnould, Thérésa Tallien, Joséphine de Beauharnais
- Profession: Military officer

Military service
- Allegiance: Kingdom of France
- Branch/service: Royal Army
- Years of service: 1771–1783
- Rank: Captain
- Unit: Régiment Royal Roussillon
- Battles/wars: Second Anglo-Mysore War; Siege of Pondicherry

Paul François Jean Nicolas, Vicomte de Barras (English: /ˈbæræs/ BA-rass, French: [pɔl fʁɑ̃swa ʒɑ̃ nikɔla də baʁas]; 30 June 1755 – 29 January 1829), commonly known as Paul Barras, was a French politician of the French Revolution, and the main executive leader of the Directory regime of 1795–1799.

== Early life ==
Descended from a noble family of Provence, he was born at Fox-Amphoux, in today's Var département. At the age of sixteen, he entered the regiment of Languedoc as a "gentleman cadet". In 1776, he embarked for French India.

Shipwrecked on his voyage, he still managed to reach Pondicherry in time to contribute to the defence of that city during the Second Anglo-Mysore War. Besieged by British forces, the city surrendered on 18 October 1778; after the French garrison was released, Barras returned to France. (Note: He left on a cartel named Sartine. This was not the Sartine that the British Royal Navy had captured at Pondicherry and taken into service.)

He took part in a second expedition to the region in 1782/83, serving in the fleet of the renowned Admiral Pierre André de Suffren. Afterwards, he spent several years back home in France at leisure in relative obscurity.

== National Convention ==
At the outbreak of the Revolution in 1789, he advocated the democratic cause, and became one of the administrators of the Var. In June 1792 he took his seat in the high national court at Orléans. Later in that year, on the outbreak of the French Revolutionary Wars, Barras became commissioner to the French Army, which was facing the forces of Sardinia in the Italian Peninsula, and entered the National Convention as a deputy for the Var.

In January 1793, he voted with the majority for the execution of Louis XVI. However, he was mostly absent from Paris on missions to the regions of the south-east of France. During this period, he made the acquaintance of Napoleon Bonaparte at the Siege of Toulon.

His later clash with Napoleon made him downplay the latter's abilities as a soldier: he noted in his Memoirs that the siege had been carried out by 30,000 men against a minor royalist defending force, whereas the real number was 12,000; he also sought to minimize the share taken by Bonaparte in the capture of the city). When Barras became Director, he gave Napoleon position of general in the battalion of Italians.

== Thermidor and the Directory ==
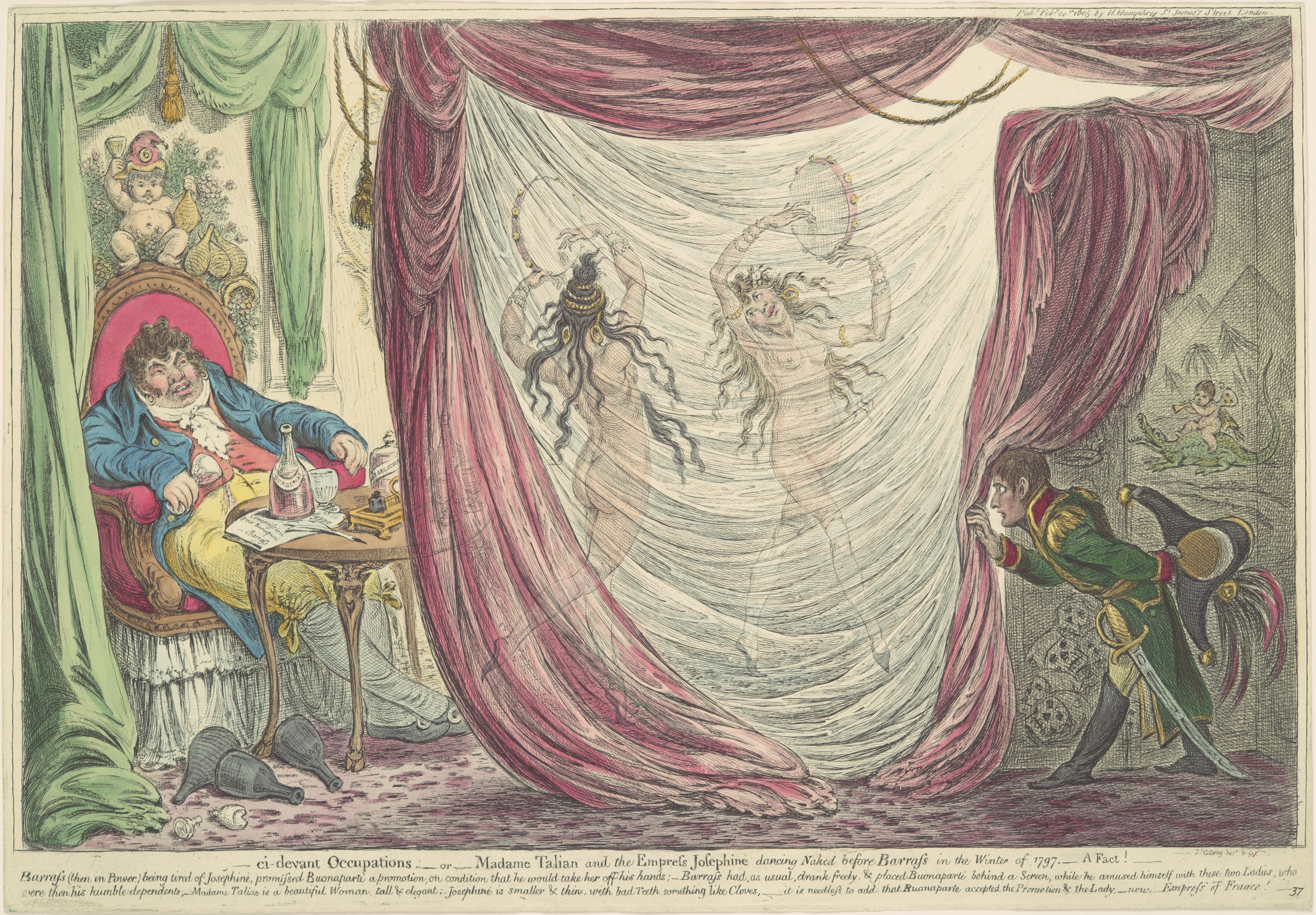
James Gillray's caricature of 1805. Barras being entertained by the naked dancing of two wives of prominent men, Thérésa Tallien and Joséphine Bonaparte. On the right, Napoleon Bonaparte takes a peek.

In 1794, Barras sided with the men who sought to overthrow Maximilien Robespierre's faction. The Thermidorian Reaction of 27 July 1794 made him rise to prominence. In the next year, when the Convention felt threatened by the malcontent National Guards of Paris, it appointed Barras to command the troops engaged in its defence. His nomination of Bonaparte led to the adoption of violent measures, ensuring the dispersion of royalists and other malcontents in the streets near the Tuileries Palace, remembered as the 13 Vendémiaire (5 October 1795). Subsequently, Barras became one of the five Directors who controlled the executive of the French Republic.

Owing to his intimate relations with Joséphine de Beauharnais, Barras helped to facilitate a marriage between her and Bonaparte. Some of his contemporaries alleged that this was the reason behind Barras's nomination of Bonaparte to the command of the army of Italy early in the year 1796. Bonaparte's success gave the Directory unprecedented stability, and when, in the summer of 1797, the royalist and surviving Girondist opposition again met the government with resistance, Bonaparte sent General Charles-Pierre Augereau, a Jacobin, to repress their movement in the Coup of 18 Fructidor (4 September 1797).

== Downfall and later life ==
Bonaparte met little resistance during his 18 Brumaire coup of November 1799. Barras supported the change of government, but was left aside by the First Consul when the latter reshaped the government of France.

Since he had amassed a large fortune, Barras spent his later years in luxury. Napoleon had him confined to the Château de Grosbois (Barras's property), then exiled to Brussels and Rome, and ultimately, in 1810, interned in Montpellier. Set free after the fall of the Empire, he died in Chaillot (now Paris), and was interred in Père Lachaise Cemetery. Although a partisan of the Second Restoration, Barras was kept in check during the reigns of Louis XVIII and Charles X (and his Memoirs were censored after his death).

== Films and television ==
In Abel Gance‘s epic 1927 film Napoléon, the role of Barras was played by Max Maxudian.

Richard McCabe played Barras in the Napoleon episode of the BBC series Heroes and Villains (2007).

Barras was portrayed by Tahar Rahim in the 2023 film Napoleon.

== See also ==
- Barras, Alpes-de-Haute-Provence

== Bibliography ==
- 1895–1896 – Memoirs of Barras, member of the Directorate. Vol. I: The ancien régime and the revolution; Vol. II: The directorate up to the 18th Fructidor; Vol. III: The directorate from the 18th Fructidor to the 18th Brumaire; Vol. IV: The consulate – The empire – The restoration – Analytical index
