= Chouannerie =

1794–1800 set of battles between the French revolutionaries and the royalists

- Part of French Revolutionary Wars
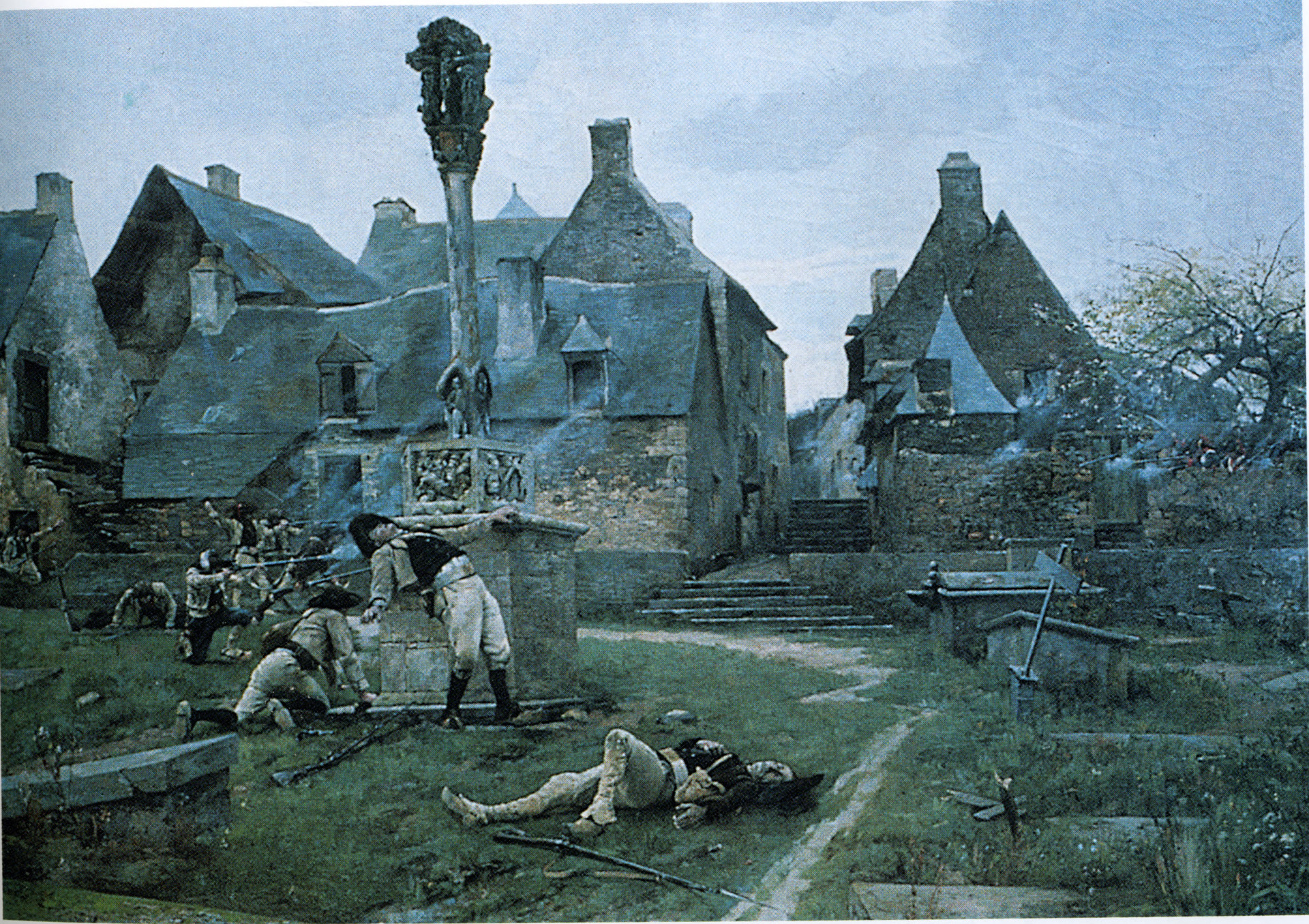
- The defence of Rochefort-en-Terre, painting by Alexandre Bloch, 1885
Date	1793–1800
Location	Brittany, Maine, Normandy
Result	Inconclusive; French republican forces were unable to defeat the Chouans militarily, Chouans ceased fighting after peace agreements in 1796 and 1800

Belligerents
(France) French Republic	Chouans; Émigrés; Great Britain

Commanders and leaders
Jean-Baptiste de Canclaux; Jean-Michel Beysser; Jean Antoine Rossignol; Jean-Baptiste Kléber; Lazare Hoche; Jean Humbert; Guillaume Brune; Gabriel d'Hédouville; Pierre Quantin; Claude Ursule Gency	Georges Cadoudal; Joseph de Puisaye; Jean Chouan †; Marie Paul de Scépeaux; Aimé du Boisguy; Louis de Frotté (executed); Pierre Guillemot †; Amateur de Boishardy; Comte Louis de Rosmorduc; Louis de Bourmont; Louis d'Andigné; Pierre-Mathurin Mercier †; Jean-Louis Treton; Guillaume Le Métayer; Charles Armand Tuffin, marquis de la Rouërie (executed)

Strength
Army of the West: 1795: 68,000 men 1799: 45,000 men 1800: 75,000 men	1795–1800: ~55,000 men

The Chouannerie (French pronunciation: [ʃwanʁi]; from the Chouan brothers, two of its leaders) was a royalist uprising or counter-revolution in twelve of the western départements of France, particularly in the provinces of Brittany and Maine, against the First Republic during the French Revolution. It played out in three phases and lasted from spring 1794 to 1800. The revolt was comparable to the War in the Vendée, which took place in the Vendée region.

The uprising was provoked principally by the Civil Constitution of the Clergy (1790), which attempted to impose Caesaropapism upon the Catholic Church in France, and the mass conscription, or levée en masse (1793), which was decided by the National Convention. A first attempt at staging an uprising was carried out by the Association bretonne to defend the French monarchy and reinstate the devolved government, specific laws, and customs of Duchy of Brittany, which had all been repealed in 1789. The first confrontations broke out in 1792 and developed in stages into a peasant revolt, guerrilla warfare and finally full-scale battles. It ended only after Chouan leaders accepted the treaties of Montfaucon and Beauregard in 1800.

Briefer peasant uprisings in other départements like in Aveyron and Lozère are also identified as "chouanneries". Another petite chouannerie broke out in 1815, during the Hundred Days War, and a final one occurred in 1832.

== Origins ==
In 1791, the adoption of the Civil Constitution of the Clergy loyalty to State requirements caused peasants around Vannes to rise to defend their bishop Sébastien-Michel Amelot from those of Lorient who wanted him to swear this oath of loyalty. In another incident, the following spring, in the area around Quimper, a justice of the peace led several parishes in an uprising in the name of King Louis XVI against the local authorities.

In the summer of 1792, further incidents occurred in the districts of Carhaix (Finistère), Lannion, Pontrieux (Côtes-d'Armor), Craon, Château-Gontier and Laval, where peasants opposed a levy of volunteers for the army. At Saint-Ouën-des-Toits, in the department of Mayenne, Jean Cottereau (known as Jean Chouan) led the insurgents. His nickname probably came from his imitation of the call of the tawny owl (the chouette hulotte) for a recognition-signal. A reward was put on his head, but he managed to reach England in March 1793. The Republican administration recognised him and his brother as the leaders of the revolt.

== Uprising ==
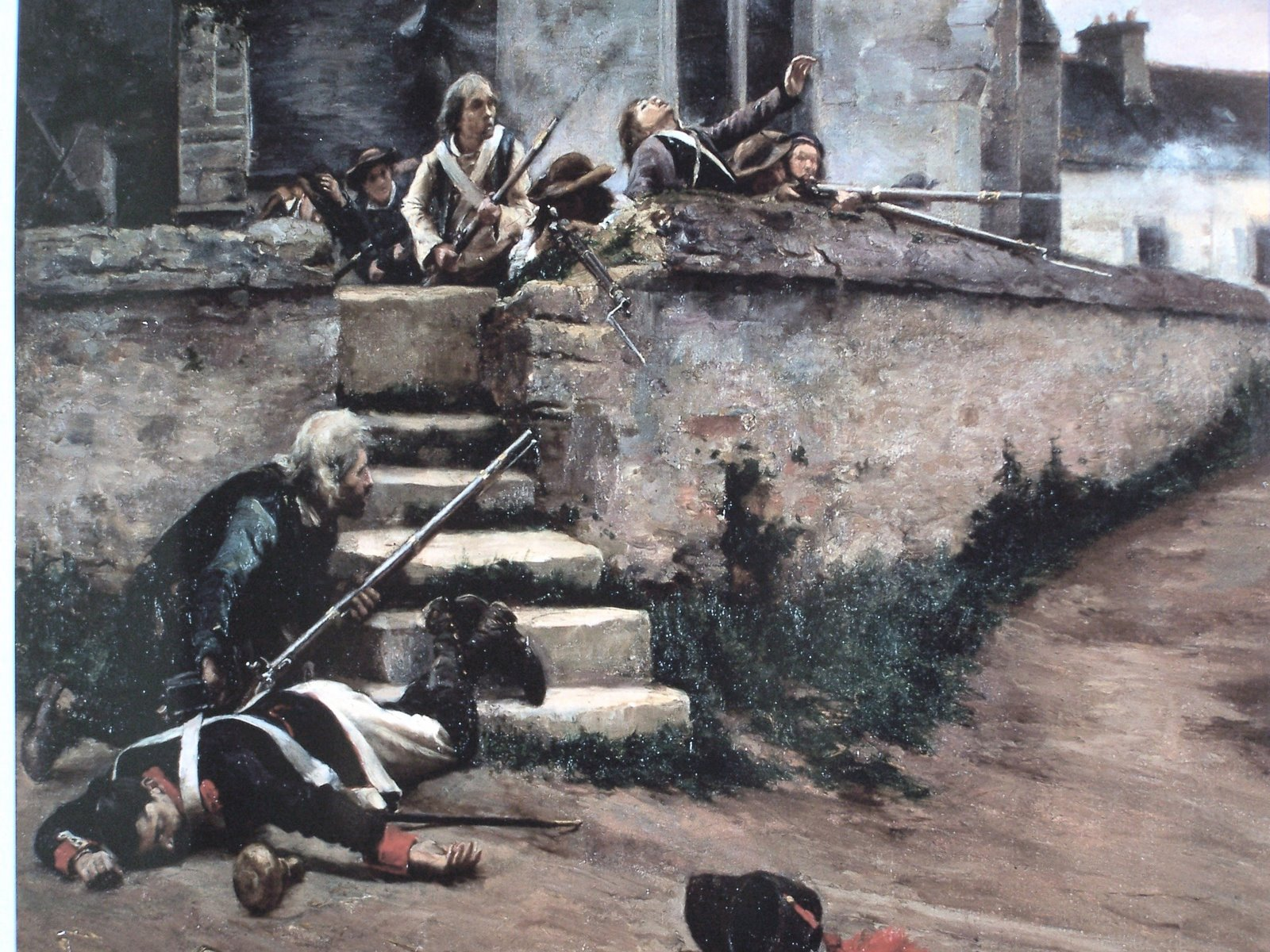
An episode of the Chouannerie, painting by Jules Girardet, 19th century.

=== First phase 1794–1795 ===
By January 1794, the Vendéans of the Vendée militaire, following a setback of the Virée de Galerne, tried to resist the infernal columns of General Louis Marie Turreau. Groups of Chouans north of the Loire took up arms again in the areas crossed by the Vendeans. The Chouannerie was born on the borders of the Mayenne and of the Ille-et-Vilaine, near Fougères, Vitré and Laval. The small groups, led by Jean Chouan, Aimé du Boisguy and Jean-Louis Treton (nicknamed Jambe d'Argent, i.e. "Silver Leg"), had Chouans and Vendeans who survived the Virée de Galerne, leaders who were compromised in the peasant uprisings of March 1793 and even deserters. Condemned to live in almost total secrecy, the Chouans knew that capture by the Republicans would mean certain death. Most of them were motivated by a desire to avenge their relatives who had disappeared in the Virée de Galerne.

Using guerrilla warfare tactics, Chouans in groups of a few score or a few hundred men ambushed military detachments, couriers and stagecoaches carrying government funds. They attacked Republican towns and executed informers, constitutional priests and republicans, and many administrators.

To oppose the Chouans, Republicans built strongholds or fortified towns, which were defended by local territorial guards. They were led by General Jean Antoine Rossignol, the chief commander of the Army of the Coasts of Brest. A law enacted on 23 March 1793 mandated that captured insurgents were to be executed by firing squad or by guillotine within 24 hours. Rossignol also assembled groups of fake Chouan outlaws to do as much as possible to discredit the real Chouans.

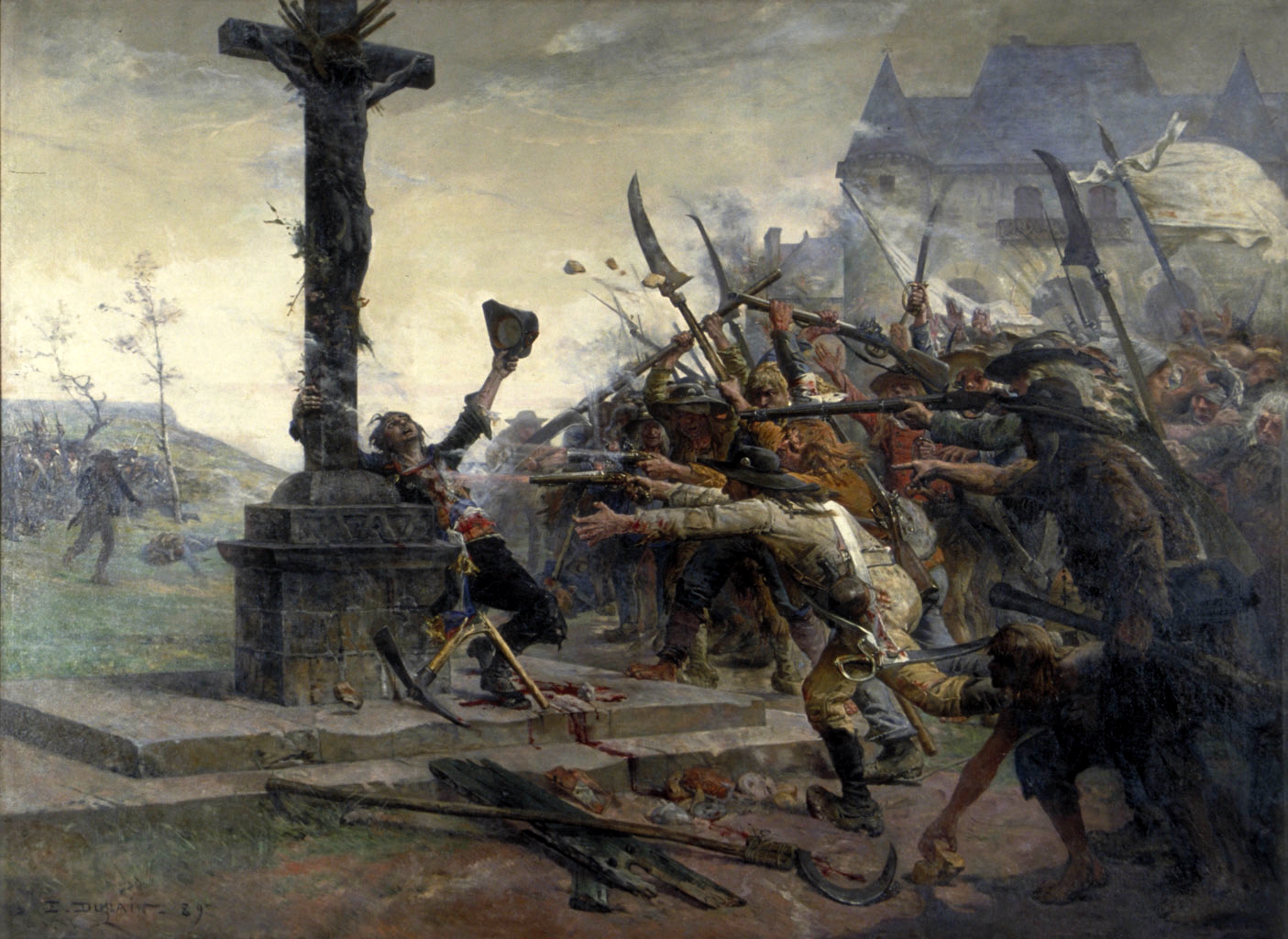
Up to 6,000 peasants hostile to conscription swept into the town of La Roche-Bernard in Brittany on 15 March 1793

Murders were carried out throughout the whole war with a varying degree of intensity, for example, in the district of Fougères, 2,000 Chouans and a fluctuating number of Republicans, 219 people were assassinated or executed by Chouans and 300 by Republicans. This number did not include deaths during fights, summary executions on the battlefield or executions following the expeditive revolutionary due process of law.

The Chouannerie spread quickly to Brittany and reached the Côtes-d'Armor, which was dominated by the Chevalier de Boishardy. On 15 March, it reached Morbihan, where Joseph de Fay and Béjarry, former officers of the Vendean army, assisted by Pierre Guillemot incited a peasant uprising aimed at Vannes. The insurgents were easily countered by the Republicans at the battle of Mangolérian. However, in Finistère and the west of Côtes-d'Armor, Basse-Cornouaille, Léon and Trégor did not take part in the uprising.

Georges Cadoudal and Pierre-Mathurin Mercier, nicknamed la Vendée, rescued from the Battle of Savenay, moved to the Morbihan, where Boulainvilliers was appointed general-in-chief of the département. However, Boulainvilliers defected to Ille-et-Vilaine with money taken from the headquarters. Sébastien de La Haye de Silz succeeded him as general. Boulainvilliers foolishly returned a few months later in the Morbihan. He was captured and shot by Pierre Guillemot's men.

Other départements, however, were not as united as the Morbihan. In the north of Anjou, Marie Paul de Scépeaux de Bois-Guignot was named commander for the north of Maine-et-Loire. His authority later extended to Loire-Atlantique, Mayenne and Sarthe. However, he commanded in name only since like in other départements, his authority as a Chouan chief only extended to his own canton. Joseph de Puisaye, a former officer who was compromised in the federalist revolts, realised the necessity of centralised command and attempted to assume the function of general-in-chief of the Chouans. Recognised by some chiefs, Puisaye embarked from Dinard to London on 11 September 1794 to meet the Comte d'Artois (the future King Charles X). Major-General Pierre Dezoteux de Cormatin, his second-in-command, assumed command in his absence.

Artois favoured absolute monarchy and distrusted Puisaye, who advocated parliamentary monarchy. However, after the intervention of British Prime Minister William Pitt the Younger, Puisaye was appointed general-in-chief of the Royal and Catholic Army of Brittany on 15 October 1794 with the rank of lieutenant general, thus entrusting him with the king's authority. His power thus extended to all the insurgent areas north of the Loire, including the Maine and Anjou, where Scépeaux appointed him general-in-chief.

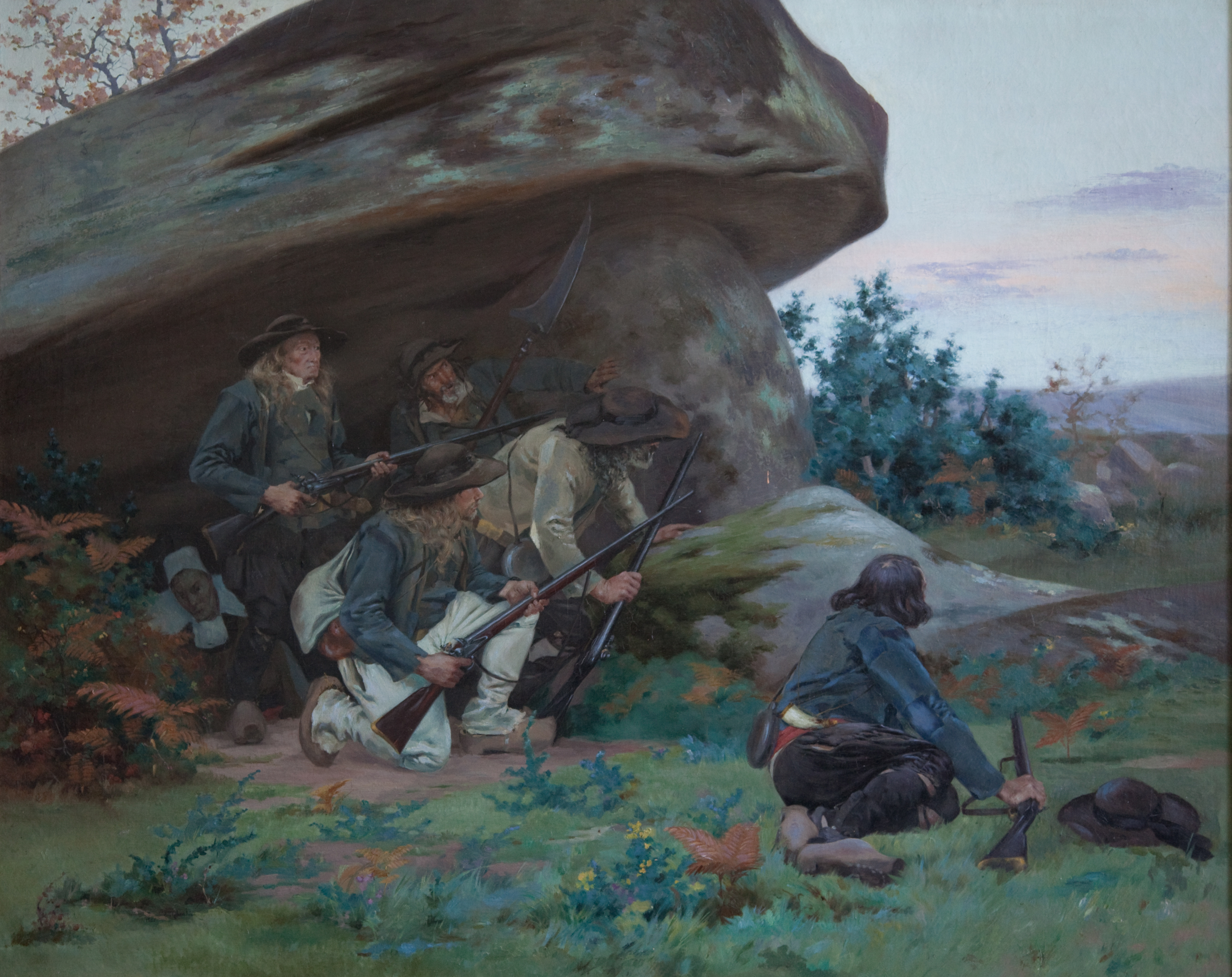
Chouans hiding behind a dolmen

When Maximilien Robespierre fell on 28 July 1794, the Terror ended and the Convention nationale became more flexible and open to negotiation. The Agence royaliste de Paris asked the Chouans in the name of Louis, comte de Provence, to stop fighting. On 26 December, Brigadier General Jean Humbert and the Chouan chief Boishardy met to discuss peace options. Puisaye tried to organise a landing from London, and his lieutenant, Cormatin, assumed full command and negotiated the peace treaty of La Mabilais in April 1795. He was followed by a few local leaders. Of the 121 leaders attending, only 21, including de Silz and Boishardy, signed the treaty.

=== Second phase 1795–1796 ===
Because neither side had negotiated in good faith, tension again increased following the death of Louis XVII on 8 June. The peace was broken on 26 August 1794 by General Lazare Hoche, who succeeded Jean Antoine Rossignol as head of the Army of the Coasts of Brest and ordered the arrest of those who had refused to sign the treaty of La Mabilais. Hoche thought that Cormatin was trying to outsmart him. Cormatin was imprisoned and would not be freed before 1802. Boishardy, who did not sign, was killed during the night of 17 to 18 June between Bréhand and Moncontour. Likewise, de Silz, who had taken up arms again, was attacked on 28 June at Grand-Champ by the troops of Adjutant-General Josnet. De Silz was killed in action, and his men retreated.

On 23 June 1795, a British fleet led by Commodore John Borlase Warren, landed 3,500 soldiers of the émigré army in Carnac. They joined 15,000 Chouans led by Vincent de Tinténiac, Paul Alexandre du Bois-Berthelot and Jacques Anne Joseph Le Prestre de Vauban, the great-grandnephew of Marshal Sébastien Le Prestre de Vauban. However, disagreements between the general of the émigrés Louis Charles d'Hervilly and the expedition leader Puisaye cost the Royalists precious time.

A counterattack by Hoche forced the Chouans back to the Quiberon peninsula. On 10 July, two columns of Chouan troops wearing English uniforms embarked on British ships from the peninsula and were landed behind Republican lines. However, the men from the first column, led by Lantivy du Rest and Jean Jan, scattered. The second column, led by Vincent de Tinténiac and seconded by Georges Cadoudal, prepared to attack but received a message from the Agence royaliste de Paris requiring them to join a second British landing at Côtes-d'Armor. Tinténiac hesitated in the face of opposition from Cadoudal but obeyed the order. He was killed on his way there at Coëtlogon on 18 July. They reached the bay of Saint-Brieuc, but since the British fleet had joined them, they returned to the Morbihan and appointed Cadoudal as their general.

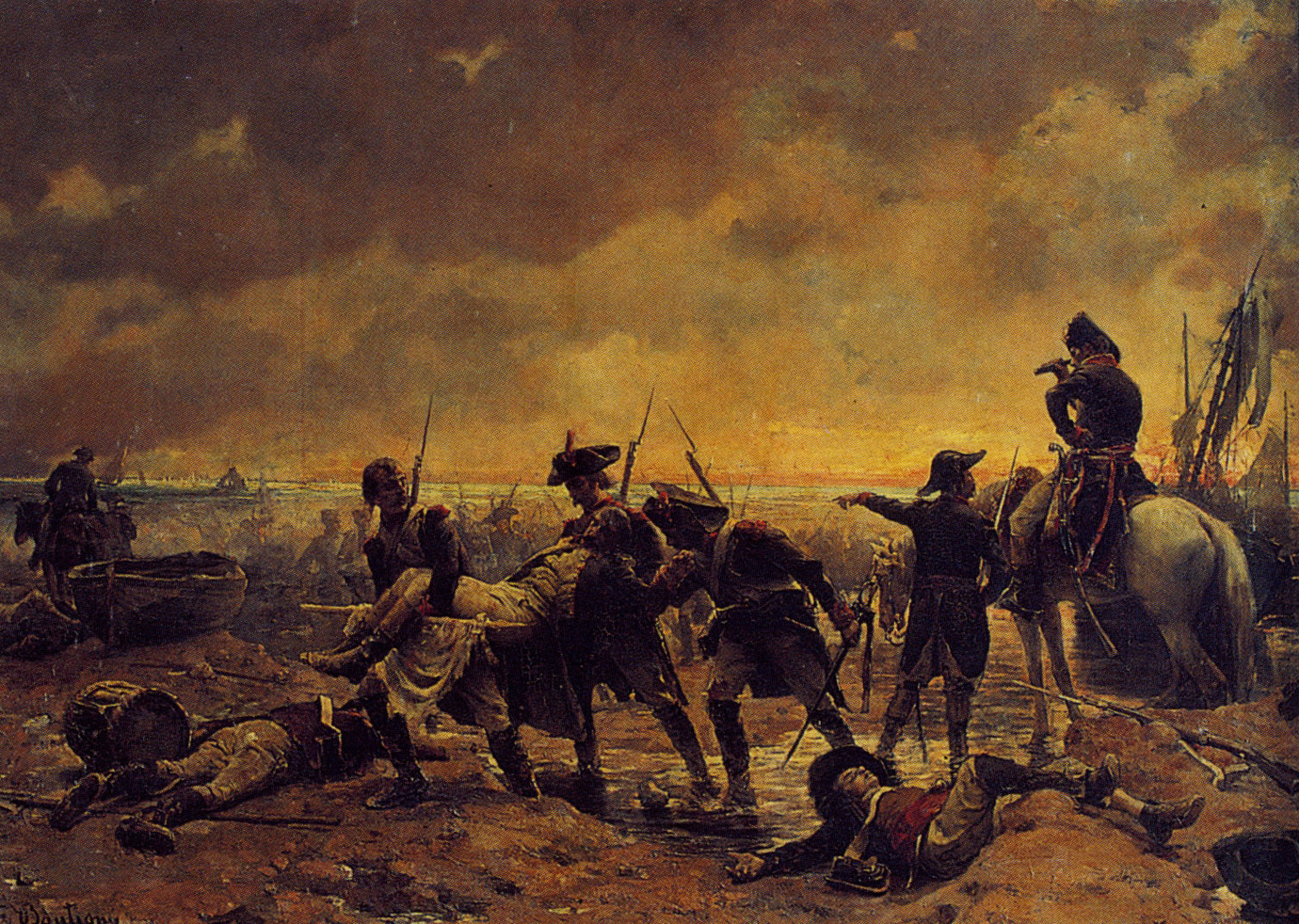
The invasion of France Un épisode de l'affaire de Quiberon (An Episode of the Quiberon affair), painting by Paul-Émile Boutigny, 19th century.

Meanwhile, in Quiberon, reinforcements of 2,000 men led by Charles de Virot de Sombreuil joined the émigrés. They attempted to attack on 16 July, but were crushed. Hoche launched a final assault on 20 July and routed the émigrés. Louis Charles d'Hervilly was fatally wounded, and Puisaye managed to board a British ship. The Republicans took more than 6,000 prisoners. 748 of them were shot by firing squad, including Sombreuil. The day before his execution, he wrote a letter to Commodore Warren denouncing the flight of the Chief General, Joseph de Puisaye.

That letter had an enormous impact on the Chouans. A council of officers in Morbihan sentenced Puisaye to death in absentia. He returned to Brittany in autumn 1795, where he was arrested by Pierre-Mathurin Mercier and brought before Cadoudal. Puisaye defended himself vigorously and found that he still had the support of the Count of Artois. Cadoual and Puisaye eventually reconciled.

Guerilla fighting resumed after the failure of the British royalist expedition and spread to Normandy, where Louis de Frotté, who had freshly landed in France in 1795, organised an uprising.

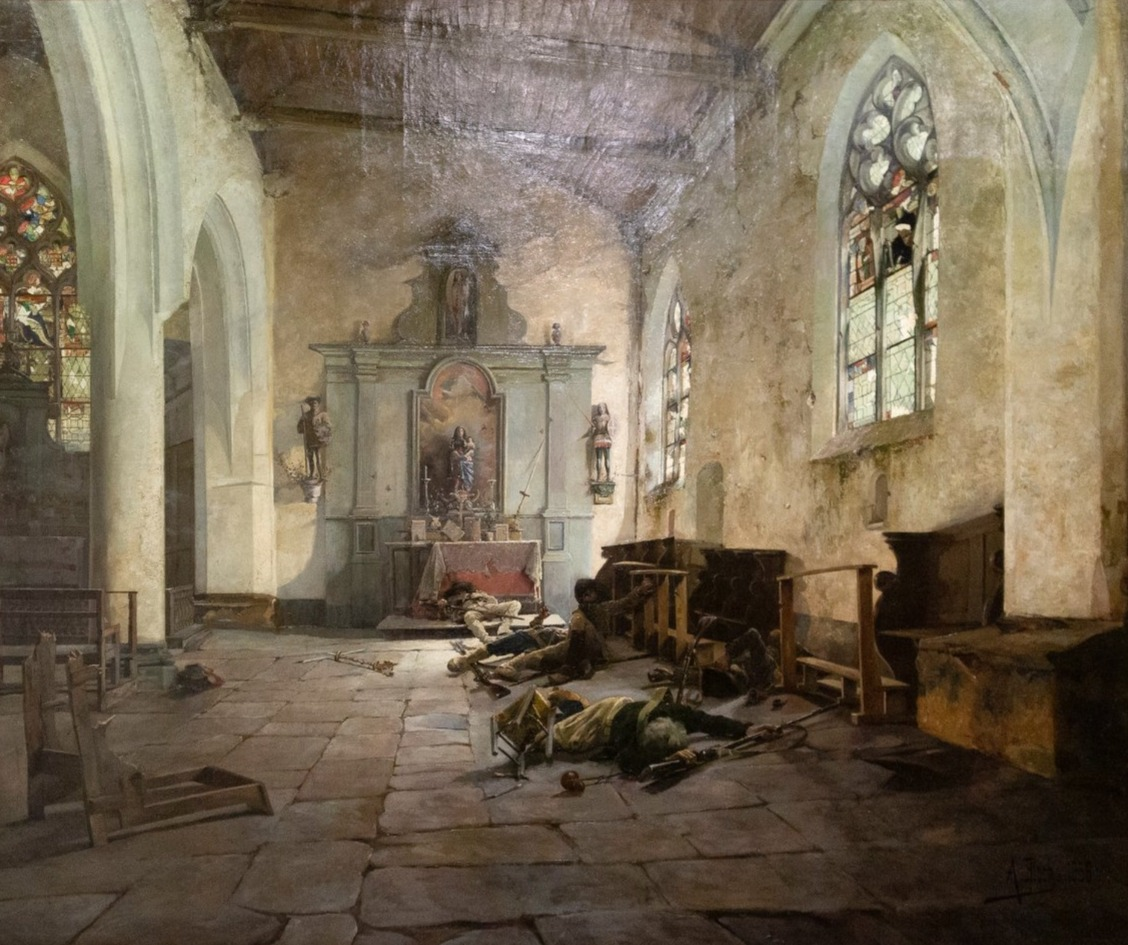
La Chapelle de La Madeleine à Malestroit (Morbihan) - 15 nivôse an III (The Chapel of La Madelaine in Malestroit), painting by Alexandre Bloch, 1886.

Puisaye had suffered a loss of reputation and blamed the Chouans of the Morbihan and their chiefs, who he claimed were hostile towards nobles and wanted to "establish equality under a white flag". Puisaye left the Morbihan for the Ille-et-Vilaine, where the division chiefs were of the nobility, and joined the Mordelles division led by Jean-Joseph Ruault de La Tribonnière. He did not receive much more support than in the Morbihan, but he remained commander-in-chief because of the support of the Count of Artois. Puisaye wanted a Chouannerie led by nobles and founded the company of the chevaliers catholiques. Several émigrés joined France to fight with the Chouans, but numerous disputes broke out among them.

In January 1796, Puisaye joined the Fougères division, the most important one in Ille-et-Vilaine, and appointed as his chief Aimé Picquet du Boisguy, Chief General of the Ille-et-Vilaine and of the east of the Côtes-d'Armor. However, in practice, Boisguy controlled only the east of Ille-et-Vilaine, and Frotté and Scépeaux acknowledged Puisaye as General-in-Chief in name only.

To fight the Chouans, the Republican forces were organised in three armies. The Army of the Coasts of Brest, led by Lazare Hoche, was based alternately in Rennes or Vannes and controlled the Finistère, the Morbihan, the Côtes-d'Armor, the Ille-et-Vilaine and the Mayenne. The Army of the West, led by Jean Baptiste Camille Canclaux, was based in Nantes and controlled Loire-Atlantique, Maine-et-Loire, the Vendée and Deux-Sèvres. The Army of the Coasts of Cherbourg, led by Jean-Baptiste Annibal Aubert du Bayet, was based in Saint-Malo and controlled Manche, Orne, Calvados, Sarthe and part of Ille-et-Vilaine.

In December 1795, the Directoire named Hoche chief general of all the Republican forces based in the West and gave him full authority. The Armies of the West, of the Coasts of Brest and of the Coasts of Cherbourg were merged to form the Army of the Coasts of the Ocean.

Despite the Quiberon disaster, the Chouans had some victories in the coming months. Hoche however changed tactics in the beginning of 1796. He set up mobile columns, promised amnesty to Chouans who surrendered, guaranteed religious freedom and strove to discipline the army. Many Chouans and Vendeans were amenable to those measures and laid down their arms.

Hoche's priority was to pacify the Vendée. Jean-Nicolas Stofflet was captured and shot by firing squad in Angers on 25 February 1796. François de Charette was hunted down, imprisoned and shot on 29 March 1796. His death marked the end of the War in the Vendée.

Since the Vendée was pacified, Hoche turned his attention to the Chouans. Faced by large Republican numbers, Chouan chiefs gradually surrendered. Scépeaux was the first to surrender, on 14 May. Georges Cadoudal signed a peace treaty on 19 June. Louis de Frotté refused to sign a peace treaty and embarked for England and left his lieutenants to sign it on 23 June. Aimé Picquet du Boisguy was the last to surrender, on 26 June. Puisaye returned to England.

=== Third phase ===
The uprising lasted until the Republican victory in 1800.

== Leaders ==
The principal leaders of the insurrection were Georges Cadoudal, his brother Julian, Jean Cottereau, called Jean Chouan; Pierre Guillemot, known as the king of Bignan; Joseph de Puisaye, Louis-Charles de Sol de Grisolles, Auguste and Sébastien de La Haye de Silz, John-Louis Treton, nicknamed Jambe d'Argent; Tristan-Lhermitte, Michel Jacquet, known as Taillefer; Joseph-Juste Coquereau, Aimé du Boisguy, Boishardy, Pierre-Mathurin Mercier and Bonfils de Saint Loup.

In Brittany, the Chouans were supported by many nobles: Charles Armand Tuffin, marquis de la Rouërie, the Chevalier de Boishardy, Count Louis of Rosmorduc, the Picquet brothers of Boisguy, as well as by commoners (the brothers Cadoudal). In Lower Normandy, Count Louis de Frotté had a dominant role. One of the lieutenants in lower Maine was Guillaume Le Métayer, who was nicknamed Rochambeau.

In the Vendée, the nobility were not able to play their normal military role. There was never any properly-organised army and was mostly small elusive bands. The Chouan leaders were, above all, peasant farmers.

In contrast to the earlier War in the Vendée of 1793, the Chouannerie did not control any large population centres, the cities and many towns having remained Republican, but some districts were openly in revolt. There was also the Petite Vendée in the lower part of Maine, which was controlled by the Prince of Talmont.

The Chouannerie was very difficult to suppress since its fighting forces had not been beaten during the Vendée War. Also, it had many leaders, and its army units were small and dispersed.

== In popular culture ==
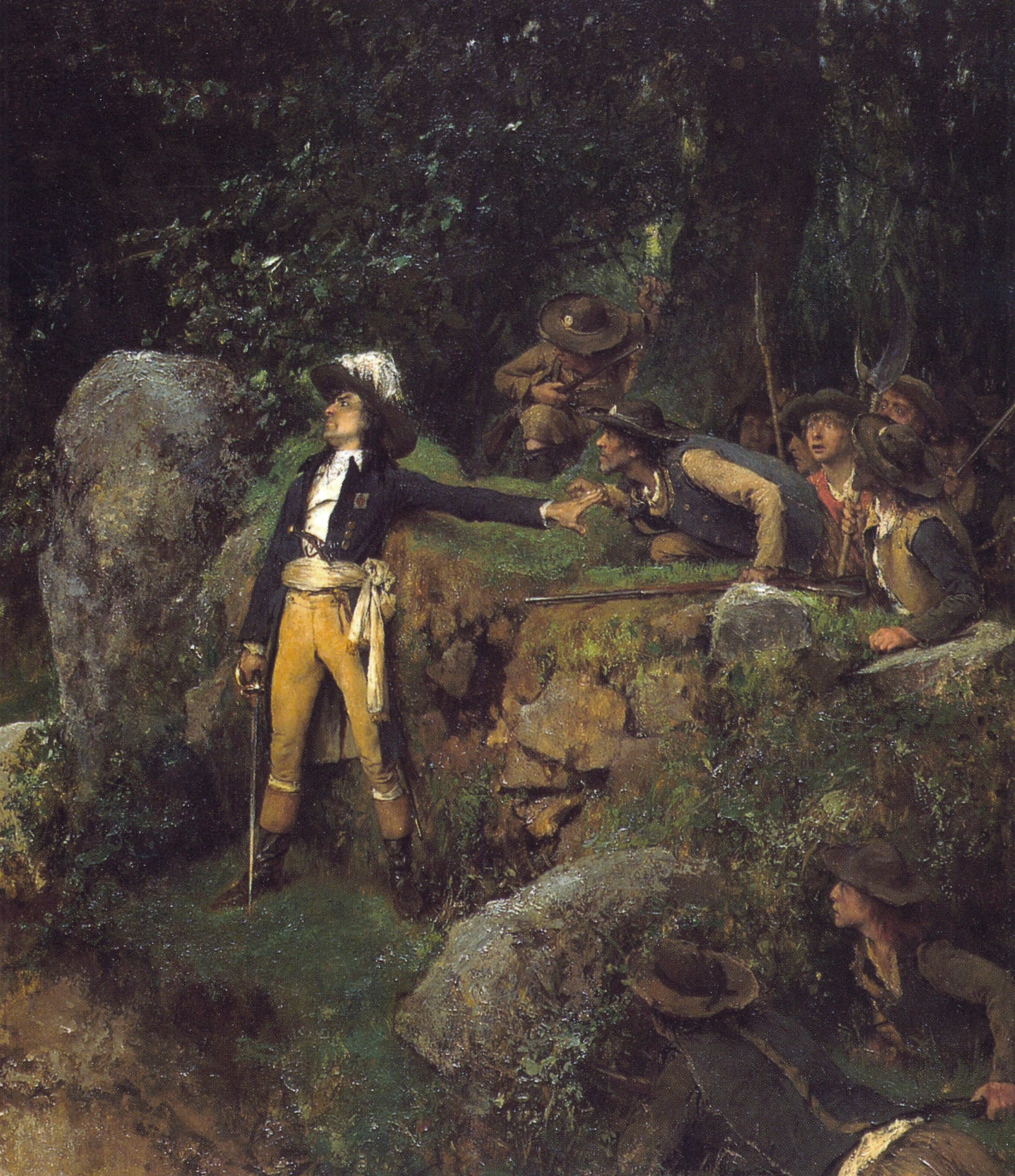
Chouan Ambush, painting by Évariste Carpentier, 19th century.

This Chouannerie uprising was featured in the novel Les Chouans by Honoré de Balzac, Ninety-Three by Victor Hugo, and The Man in Grey, a collection of short stories about the Chouans by Baroness Orczy. The uprising is also the central action of the novel The Marquis of Carabas by Rafael Sabatini. It was also depicted in paintings and popular imagery.

In Breton literature, Lan Inisan published Emgann Kergidu ("The Battle of Kergidu") in 1877, the first and only novel in the Breton language to be published as a book before the First World War. The novel is set during the 1793 uprising in Saint-Pol-de-Léon.
Some of the popular songs collected in the 19th century in the insurrection zone were devoted to the celebration of persons and events relevant of the moments. For example : "Ar Re c'hlas" (The blue men = blue-uniformed), in the "Barzaz Breiz", a song collection edited in 1839.

== Bibliography ==
=== Historical ===
- Jacques Duchemin des Cépeaux, Souvenirs de la Chouannerie, 1855;
- Émile Souvestre, Scènes de la Chouannerie, Michel Lévy, Paris, 1856;
- Abbé Jean-François Paulouin, La Chouannerie du Maine et Pays adjacents. 1793–1799–1815–1832. Avec la Biographie de plus de 120 Officiers., Monnoyer, Le Mans, 1875
- Jean Morvan, Les Chouans de la Mayenne. 1792 - 1796, Lévy, Paris, 1900
- Abbé Almire Belin (dir.), La Révolution dans le Maine. Revue bimestrielle, Imprimerie Benderitter puis M. Vilaire, Le Mans, 1925–1937
- Marc Valin, Chouans de la Mayenne, Éditions Siloé, Laval, 1985
- Jean Barreau, La chouannerie mayennaise sous la Convention et le Directoire, Imp. Martin, Le Mans, 1988.
- Anne Bernet, Les Grandes Heures de la chouannerie, Perrin, 1993
- Roger Dupuy, Les Chouans, Hachette Littérature, 1997.
- Anne Bernet, Histoire générale de la chouannerie, Perrin, 2000.
- Jean Lepart,"Histoire de la Chouannerie dans la Sarthe", in Revue Historique et Archéologique du Maine, Le Mans, tome CLIII, p. 13-64, 2002 and tome CLV, p 65–120, 2004.
- Hubert La Marle, Dictionnaire des Chouans de la Mayenne, Éditions régionales de l'Ouest - Mayenne. 2005.
- Bernard Coquet, Le dernier des Chouans Louis-Stanislas Sortant, 1777–1840, Éditions Ophrys-SPM, Paris, 2007.

=== Works of fiction ===
- Honoré de Balzac, Les Chouans ou la Bretagne en 1799, La Comédie humaine, tome XIII. (also adapted as a film, Les Chouans, by Henri Calef, with Jean Marais, 1946).
- Victor Hugo, Quatrevingt-treize, 1874.
- Jules Barbey d'Aurevilly, L'Ensorcelée. and Le Chevalier des Touches.
- Michel Ragon, les mouchoirs rouges de Cholet.
- The film Chouans!, by Philippe de Broca, with Philippe Noiret, Sophie Marceau, Lambert Wilson and Stéphane Freiss, 1988.
- D. K. Broster, 'Chantemerle', 1912.
- D. K. Broster, 'Sir Isumbras at the Ford', 1918.
- D. K. Broster, 'The Yellow Poppy', 1920.

Preceded by Battle of Fleurus (1794)	French Revolution: Revolutionary campaigns Chouannerie	Succeeded by Battle of Aldenhoven (1794)
