= Vincent de Tinténiac =

Royalist Invasion of France Leader

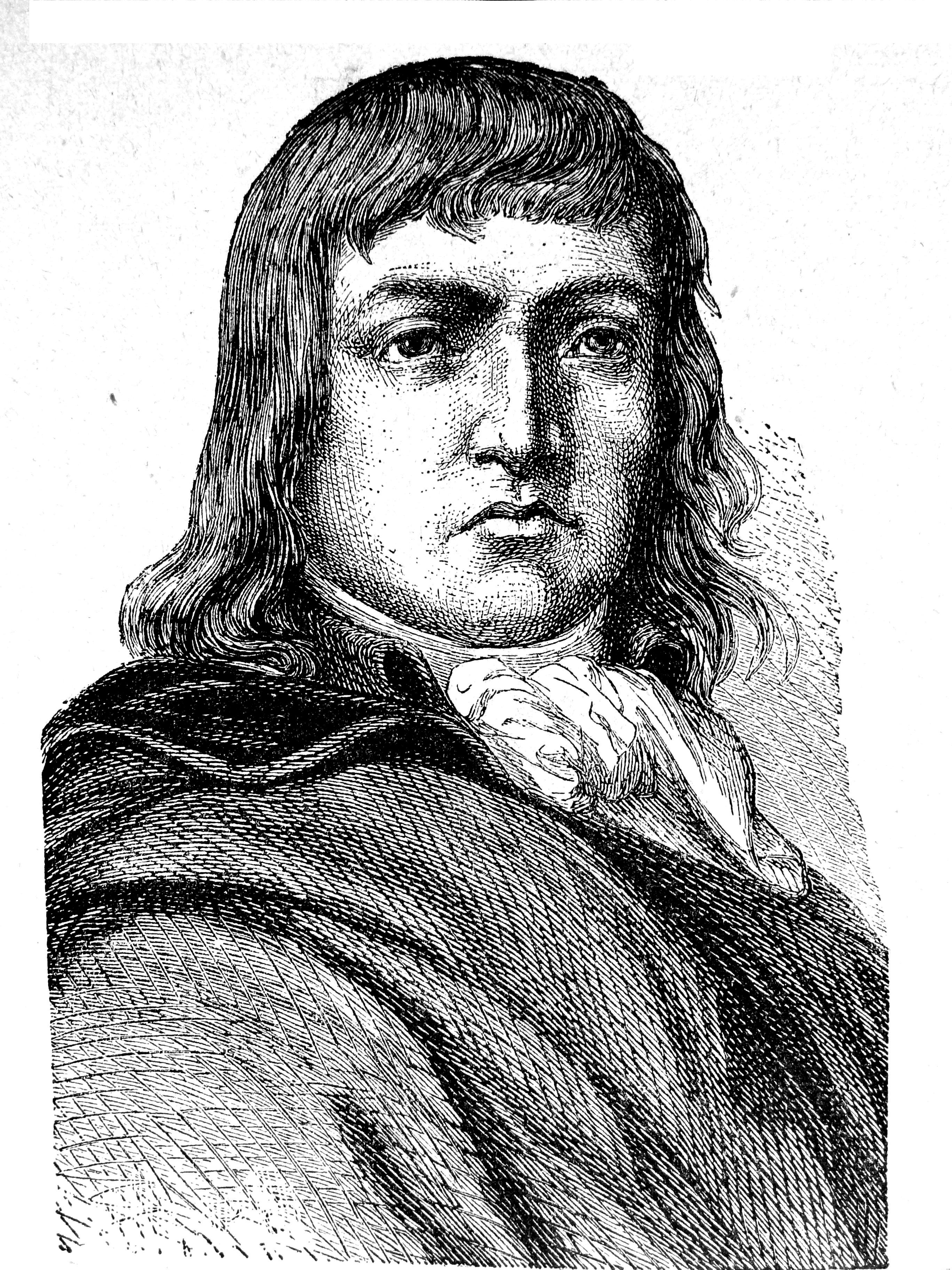

Vincent de Tinténiac (French pronunciation: [vɛ̃sɑ̃ də tɛ̃tenjak]; c. 1764 in Bannalec – 18 July 1795 in château de Coëtlogon) was a French general.

== Life ==
Before the French Revolution he had served as a lieutenant in the French Royal Navy but was dismissed. In 1791 he joined the Association Bretonne of Armand Tuffin de La Rouërie, in which he served as a liaison officer between Brittany and the Isle of Jersey. Upon the Association's fall in 1793 he fought in the war in the Vendée, delivering to the Vendéens dispatches promising British help if they would help capture a port. In 1794, Tinténiac helped Joseph de Puisaye take command of the Chouannerie. He then took an active part in the Quiberon landings, for which he was made a maréchal de camp, and then took command of a division of Chouans. He was killed in a skirmish at château de Coetlogon.

== Novel ==
A historical novel by Théophile Briant Les Amazones de la Chouannerie, published in 1938, is inspired by the life of the Knight of Tinténiac and his love with the legendary heroine Jacquemin, through the tragic episodes of the battles of the Breton Chouannerie.
