= Battle of Quiberon =

Battle of Quiberon may refer to:

- Battle of Quiberon Bay
- Battle of Quiberon (1795)
