= Weapons of honour =

Awards of France

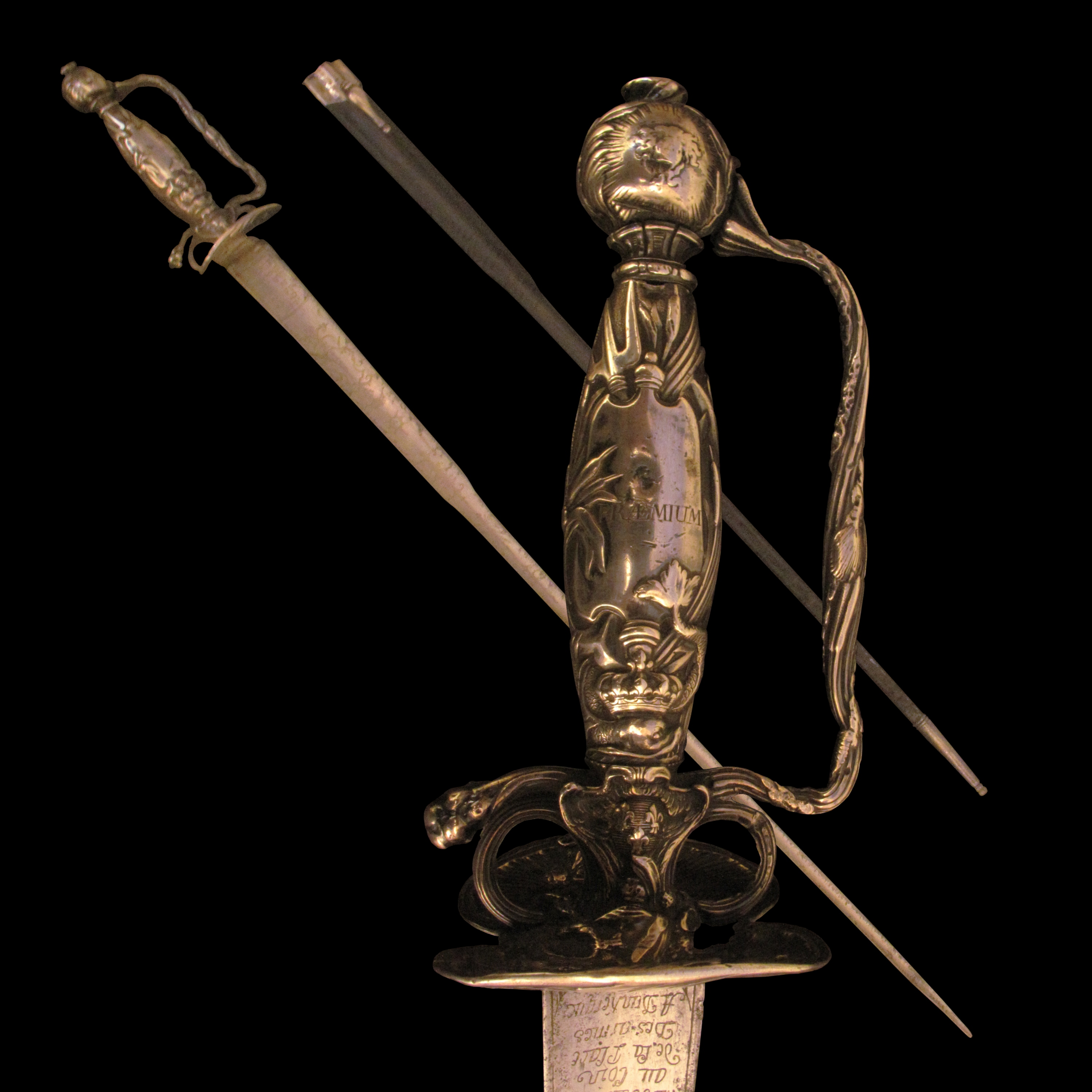
Sword of honour of Pierre Anguier.

Weapons of honour (French: Armes d'honneur) are honorary weapons awarded for service or assistance to France.

== History ==
Swords of honour were awarded during the ancien régime for exceptional service. On 30 April 1746, Minister of the Navy Maurepas awarded such a sword to privateer Pierre Anguier for his intervention in the Jacobite rising of 1745.

Established on 25 December 1799 and issued by the French Consulate, weapons of honour were awarded as military awards for feats of arms. The civilian version of this distinction is the scarf of honour (l'écharpe d'honneur). This completed and materialised the practice of solemnly declaring a citizen or group of citizens to have bien mérité de la Patrie.

Weapons of honour were replaced during the First French Empire by the institution of the chivalry Order of the Legion of Honour. Recipients of weapons of honour automatically received the Legion of Honour after its inception.

== Types ==
Each component of the Napoleonic armies had its own distinction and weapons of honour:

- Drumsticks given to the drummers
- Whips of honour awarded to the drivers of artillery
- Guns and swords awarded to soldiers and grenadiers
- Golden grenades to artillery assigned to the accuracy of their shots
- Carbines and rifles assigned to cavalry troopers
- Pistols of honour awarded to officers
- Trumpets assigned to the buglers and trumpeters
- Sword of honour (or Sabre of honour), divided into three categories, are awarded for exceptional actions outside the scope of the items above.
Weapons from the ancien régime era
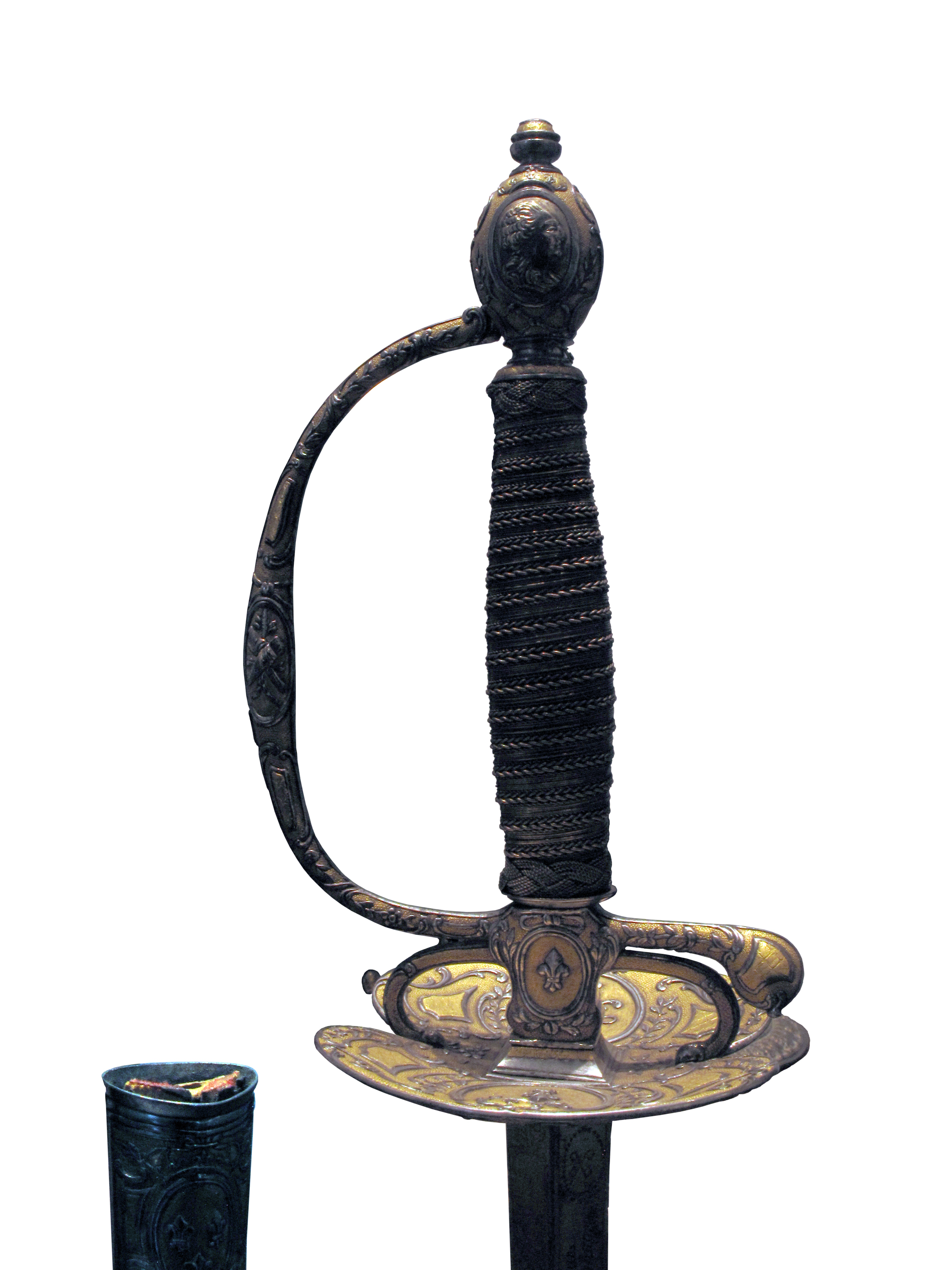
Smallsword issued by the French Crown, 1789

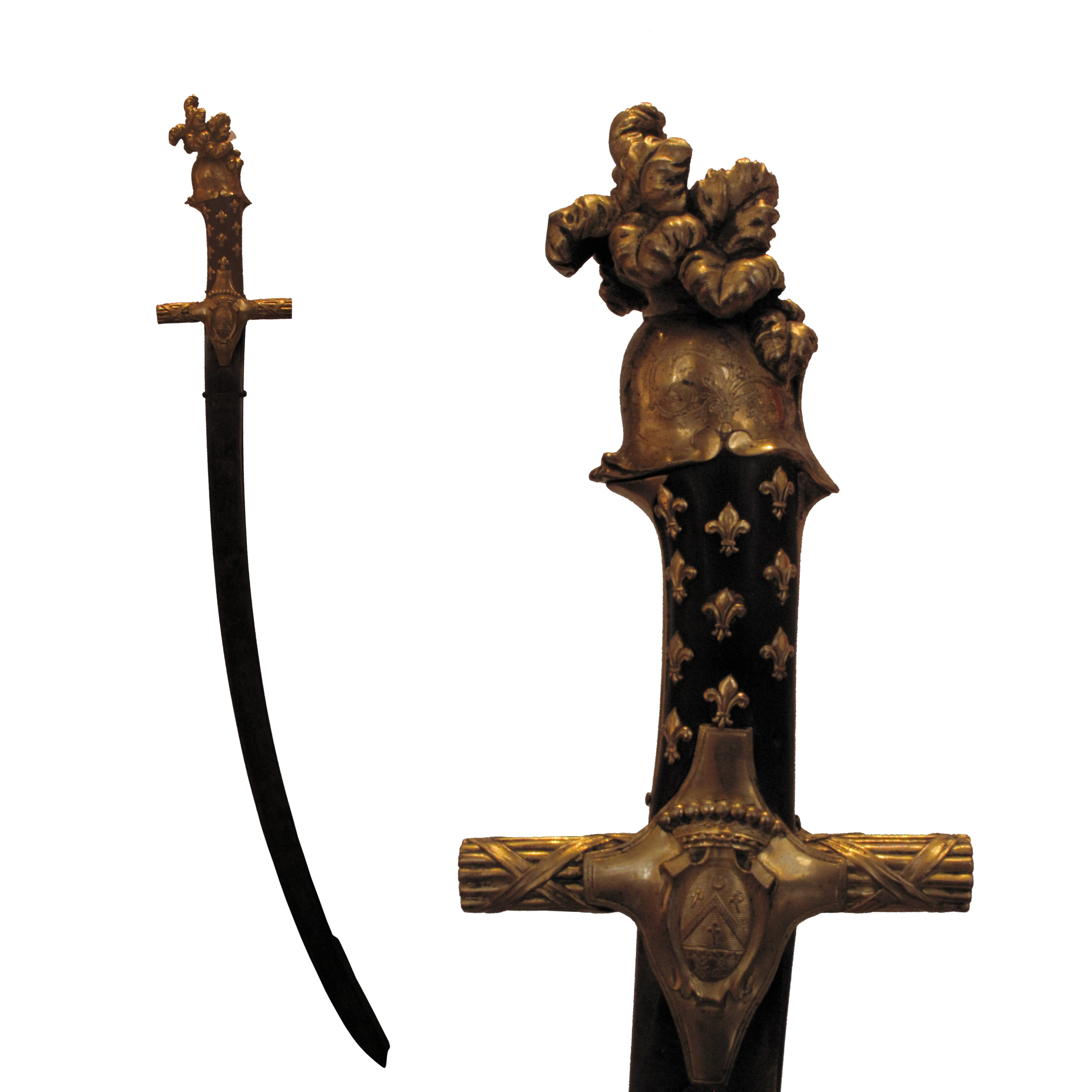
Sabre of honour offered to Jacques Anne Joseph Le Prestre, Marquis of Vauban by the United States during the American Revolutionary War
Weapons from the Consulate era
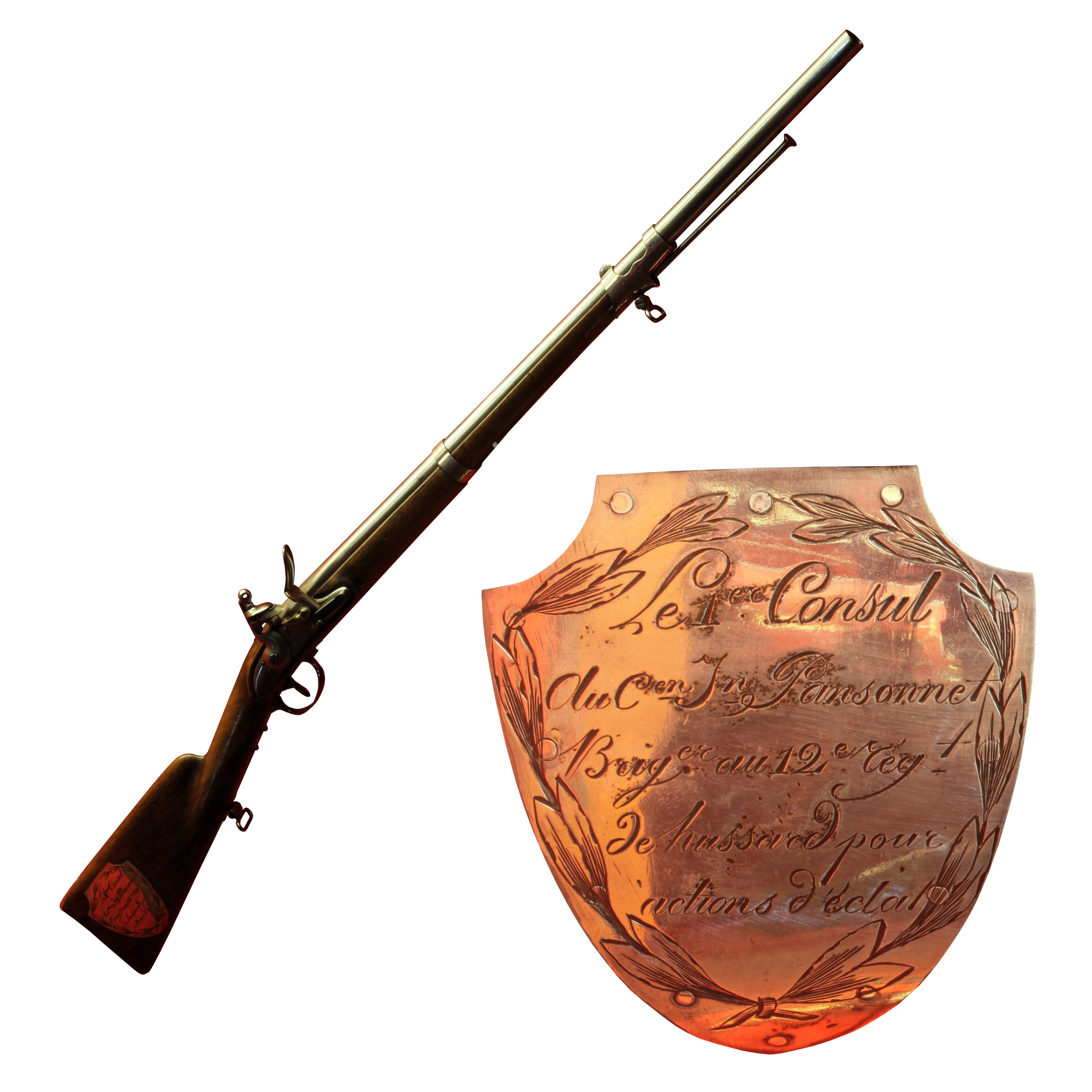
Honour carbin: "The First Consul to citizen Jean Pansonnet, brigadier in the 12th hussard regiment, for outstanding deed".

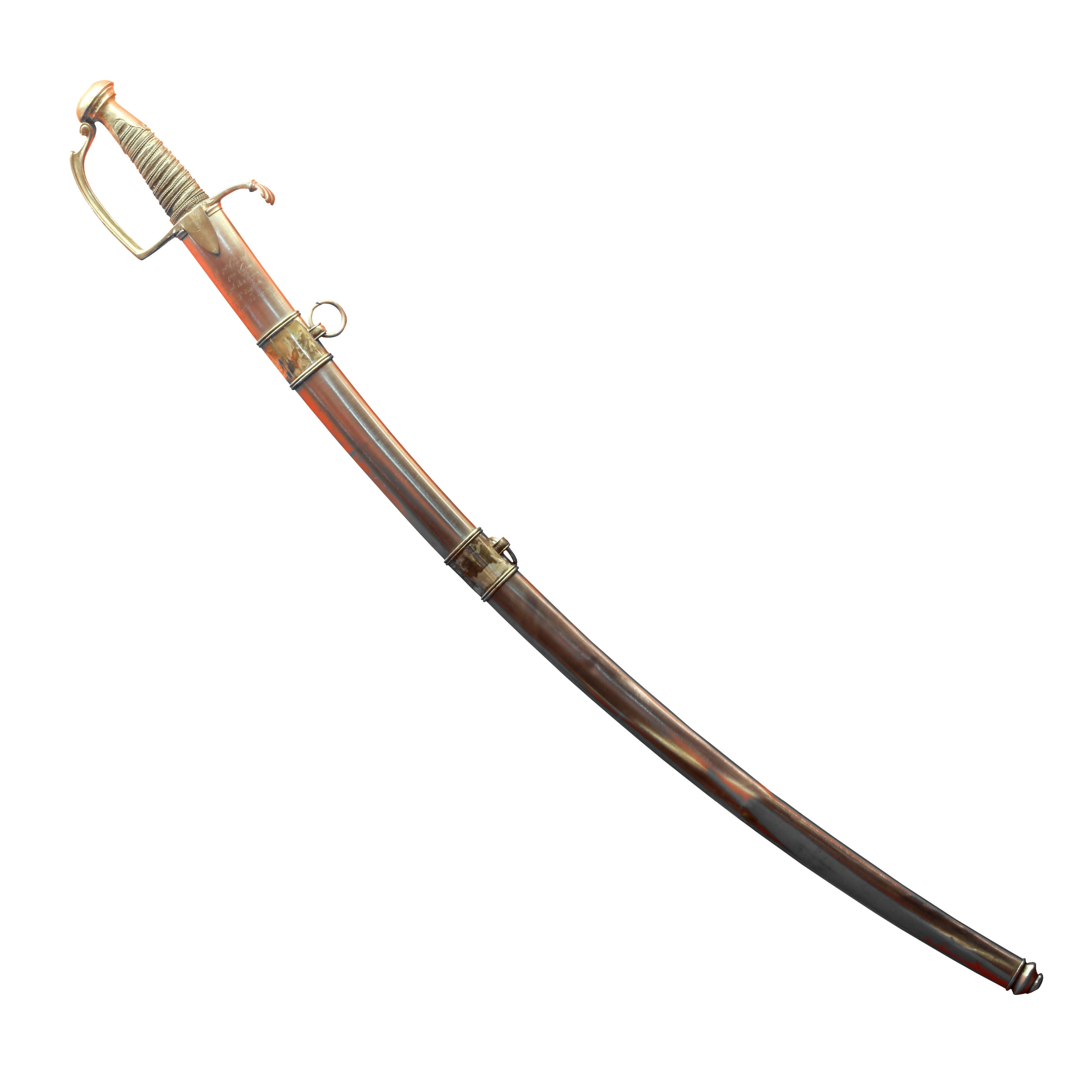
Sabre of honour: "The First Consul to citizen Antoine Vigne, maréchal des logis at the 5th regiment of mounted chasseurs".

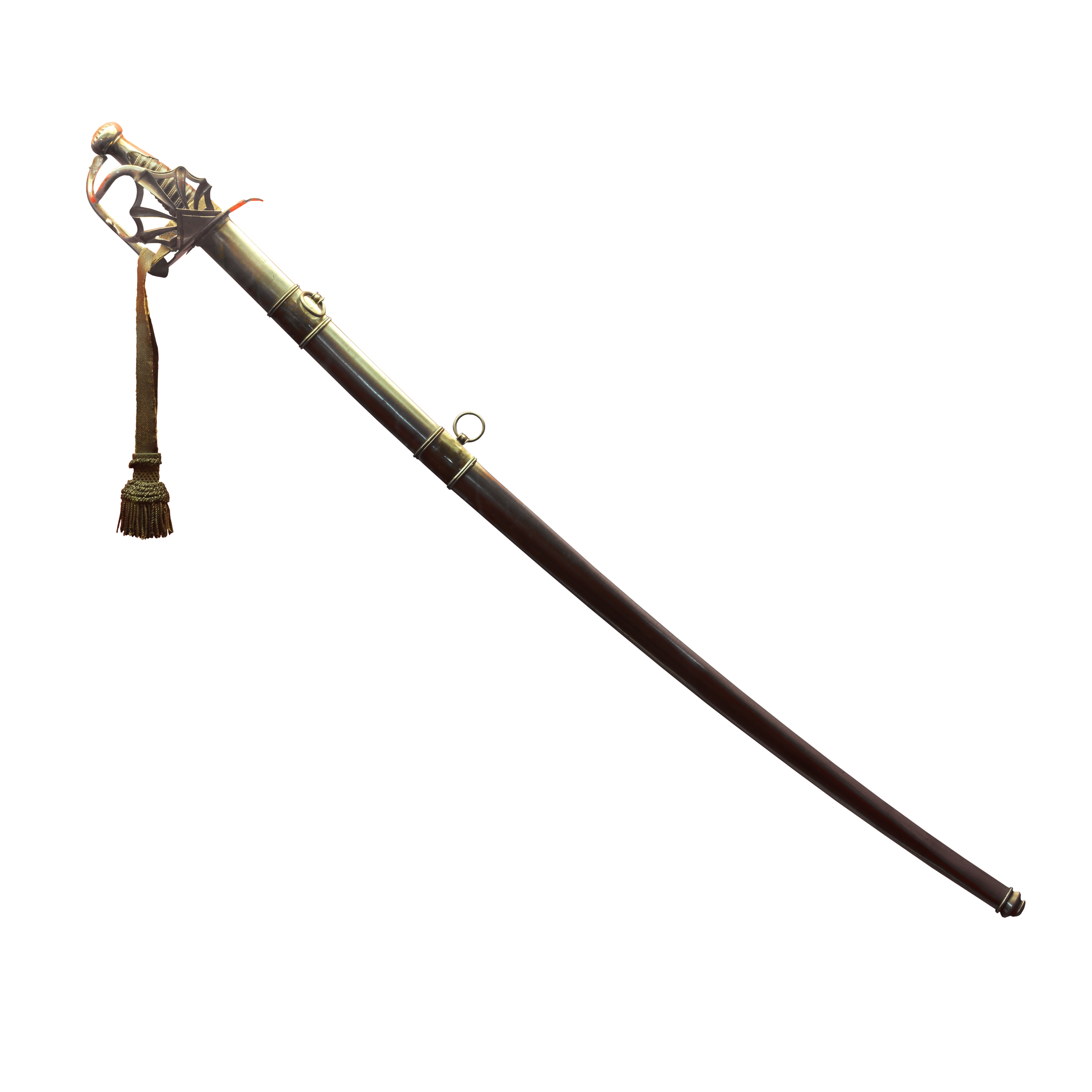
Sabre of honour: "The First Consul to citizen Rénade Conrot, maréchal des logis at the 5th regiment of mounted chasseurs".

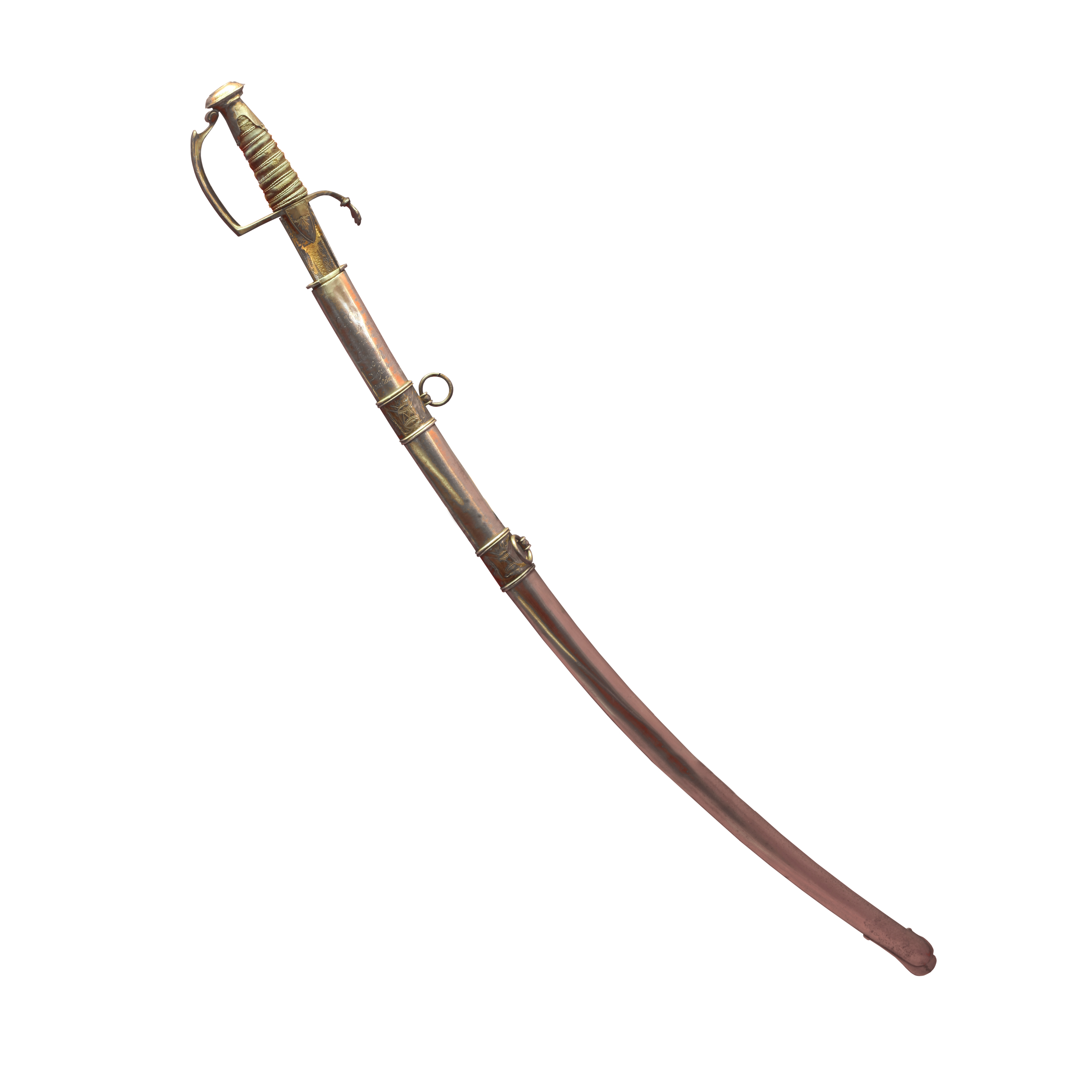
Sabre of honour: "The First Consul to citizen Joseph Davance, sous-lieutenant of the 10th light infantry regiment, for outstanding deed".

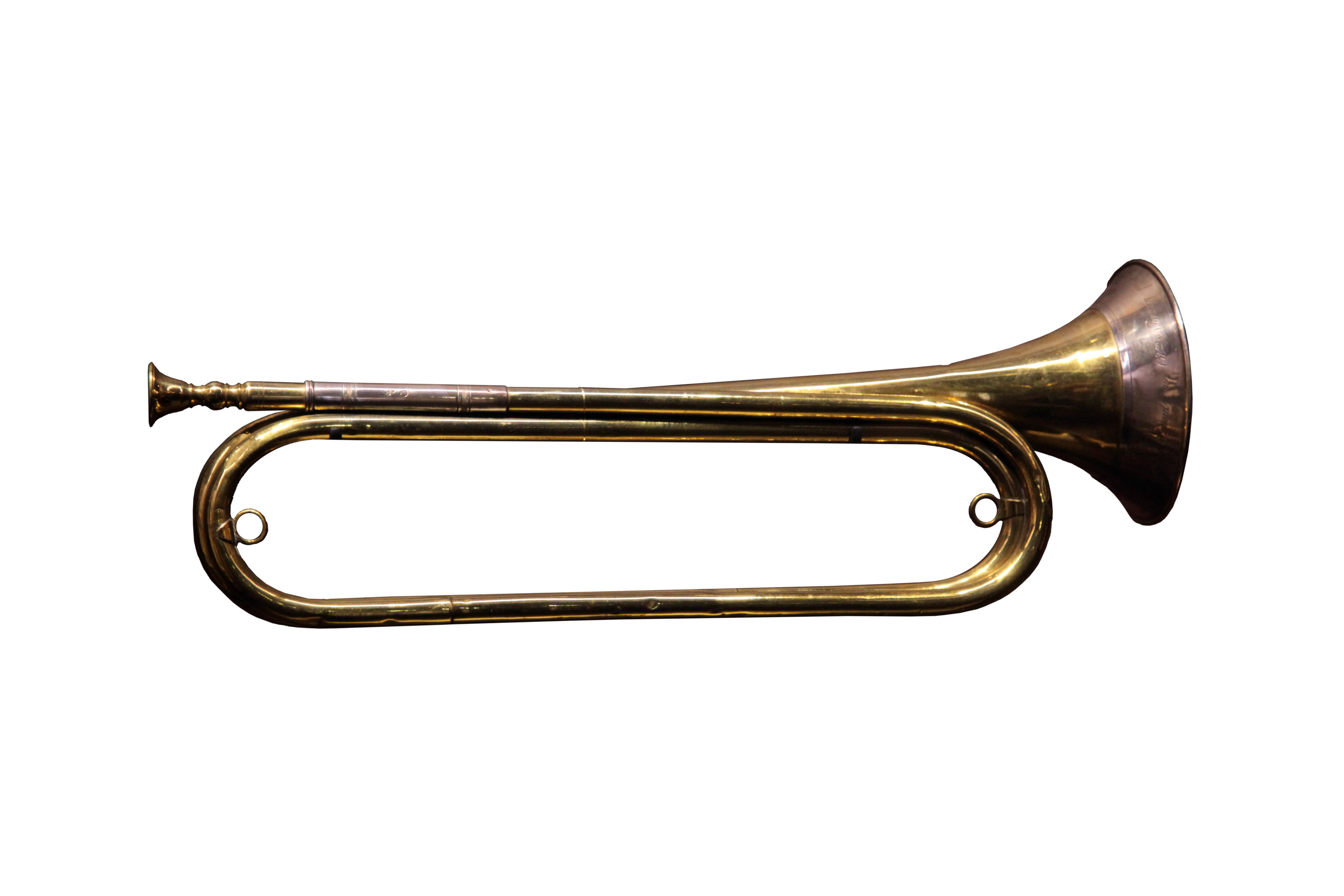
Trumpet of honour bestowed upon Corporal Bonnet, of the Mounted Grenadiers of the Consular Guard, for distinguished conduct at the Battle of Marengo, on display at the Musée de l'Armée

== Notes and references ==
=== Bibliography ===
- Armes d'honneur via Napoleon.org (French)
- Trompette d’honneur, page of the Musée de l'Armée depicting a trumpet of honour
