= Jacques Anne Joseph Le Prestre, Marquis of Vauban =

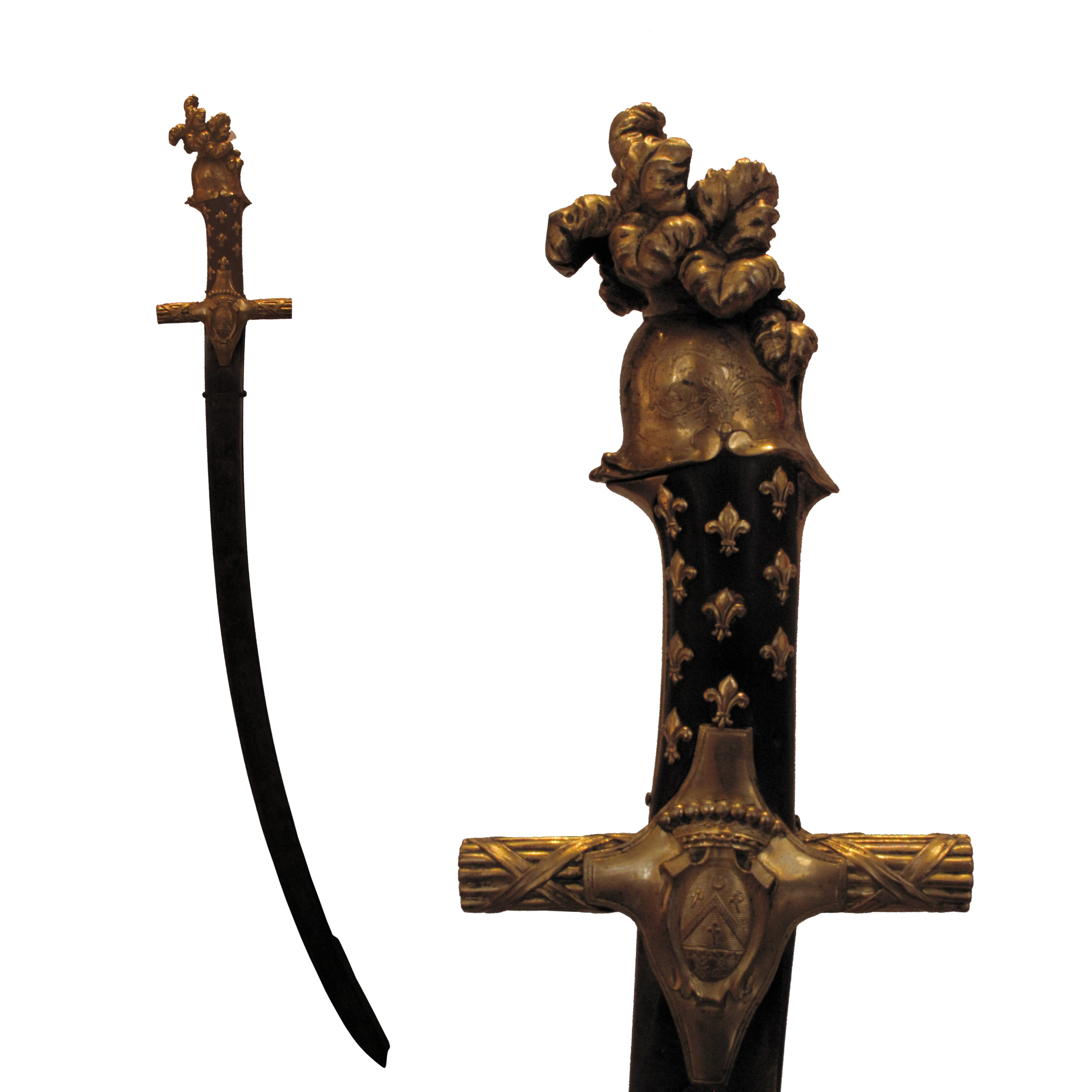
A sabre of honour offered to Vauban by the United States during the American Revolutionary War

Jacques Anne Joseph Le Prestre, Marquis of Vauban (10 March 1754 – 20 April 1816) was a French Royal Army officer who served in the American Revolutionary War. During the French Revolutionary Wars, Vauban participated in Royalist uprisings against the French First Republic.

== Life ==
Jacques Anne Joseph Le Prestre was born on 10 March 1754 in Dijon. Joining the French Royal Army in 1770, he served as an aide-de-camp to Jean-Baptiste Donatien de Vimeur, comte de Rochambeau during the American Revolutionary War and was sent back to France with Rochambeau's dispatches in 1782. Vauban became colonel and second in command of the Agénois Regiment. Shortly afterwards, Louis Philippe I, Duke of Orléans, whom he served as a chamberlain, made Prestre a colonel of the Duke of Orléans' Regiment and knight of the Order of Saint Louis on 13 June 1784.

Like many French army officers, he emigrated around the time of Louis XVI's flight to Varennes, going to Ath and then Koblenz, where the Count of Artois made him his aide-de-camp. Vauban accompanied him in this role during the campaigns of 1792 in the French Revolutionary Wars and the Count of Artois' visit to Russia in 1793, where they were received by Catherine the Great. He then went to England, and in spring 1795 participated the invasion of France. Tasked by Joseph-Geneviève de Puisaye with commanding a unit of Chouans and attacking the rear of the French Revolutionary Army, Vauban was blocked by Republican troops under Lazare Hoche and was forced to retreat after being tricked by false signals.

He then made several visits to the Vendée and the île d'Yeu with the Count of Artois. From London, Vauban went to Russia but arrived there after Catherine died in November 1796, and was like most French royalists in Russia forced to leave by Paul I. He returned to France and stayed for a period of time in Paris with police consent. However, Vauban was arrested in 1806 and imprisoned in the Square du Temple until Napoleon abdicated in 1814, eventually dying on 20 April 1816.

== Notes, citations, and references ==
Notes

Citations

References

- "Jacques Anne Joseph Le Prestre", in Louis-Gabriel Michaud, Biographie universelle ancienne et moderne : histoire par ordre alphabétique de la vie publique et privée de tous les hommes avec la collaboration de plus de 300 savants et littérateurs français ou étrangers, 2e édition, 1843–1865
