= Bignan =

Commune in Brittany, France

Bignan Begnen
- Commune
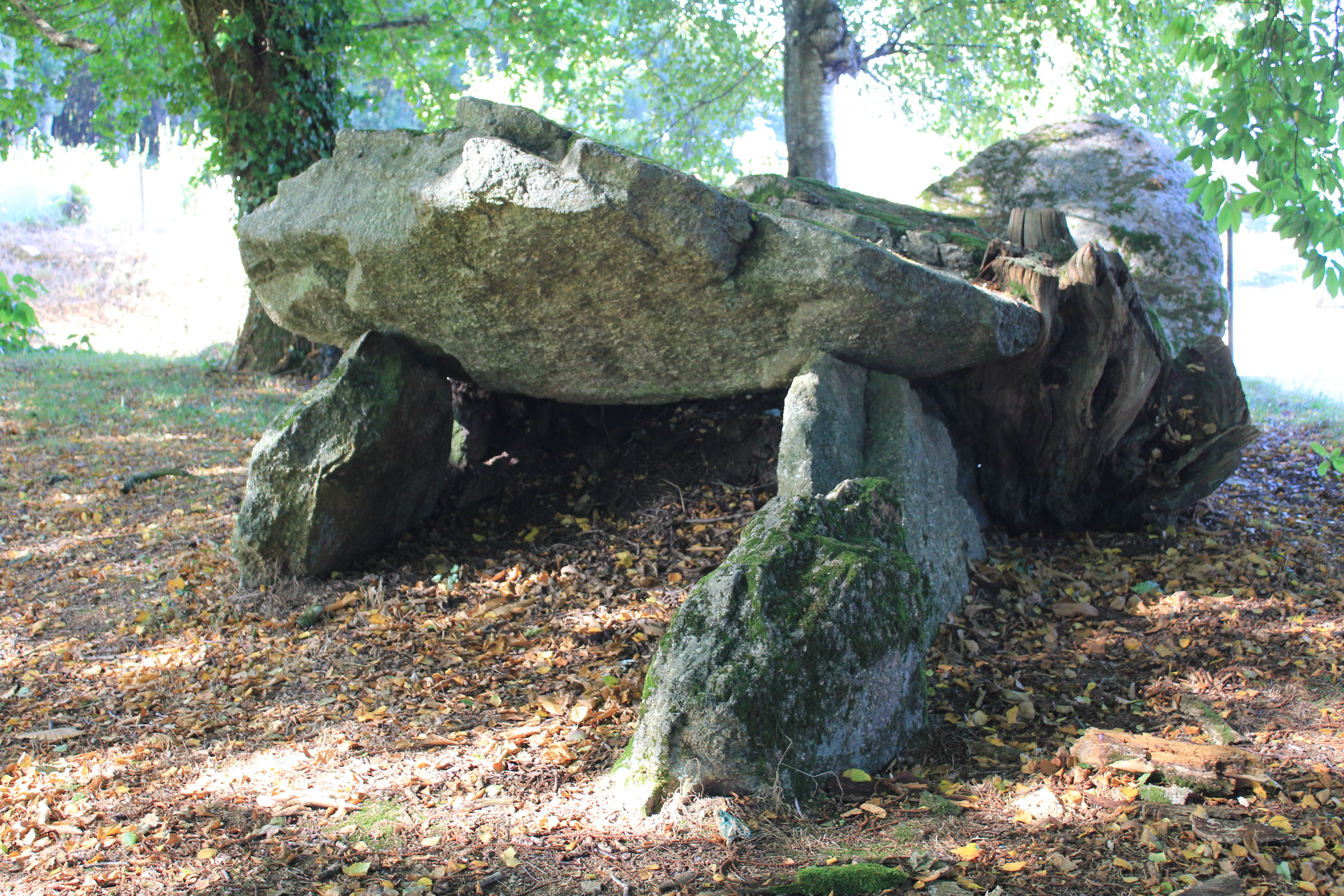
- The Allée couverte de Kergonfalz

- Coat of arms
- Location of Bignan
- Location within France Location within Brittany
- Coordinates: 47°52′48″N 2°46′23″W
- Country: France
- Region: Brittany
- Department: Morbihan
- Arrondissement: Pontivy
- Canton: Moréac
- Intercommunality: Centre Morbihan Communauté

Government
  - Mayor (2026–32): Chantal Bihoes
- Area^{1}: 45.84 km^{2} (17.70 sq mi)
- Highest elevation: 181 m (594 ft)
- Lowest elevation: 53 m (174 ft)
- Population (2023): 2,757
  - Density: 60.14/km^{2} (155.8/sq mi)
- Time zone: UTC+01:00 (CET)
  - Summer (DST): UTC+02:00 (CEST)
- INSEE/Postal code: 56017 /56500
- ^{1} French Land Register data, which excludes lakes, ponds, glaciers > 1 km^{2} (0.386 sq mi or 247 acres) and river estuaries.

Bignan (French pronunciation: [biɲɑ̃]; Breton: Begnen) is a commune in the Morbihan department in Brittany in northwestern France.

== Location ==
The town is based on the Landes de Lanvaux. Bignan is located between the townships of Locminé and Saint-Jean-Brévelay. Bignan is only half an hour from the main cities of Morbihan: Vannes, Lorient and Pontivy.

== History ==
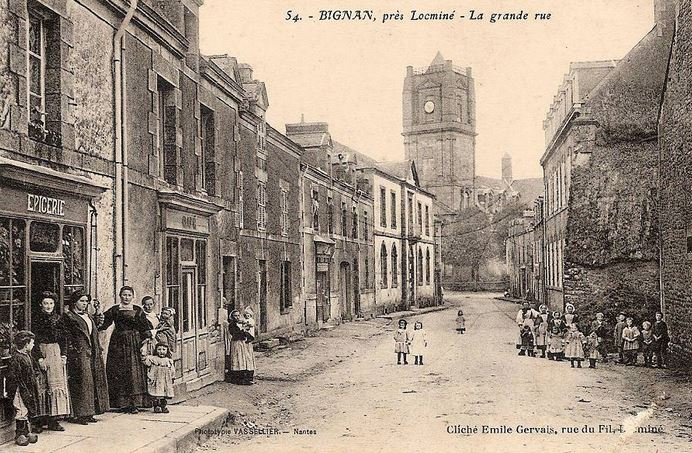
Bignan main Street latter 19th century.

In the 5th century Saint Noyale was said to be martyred in or near the town.

In 1252, Guillaume de Bignan founded the nearby abbaye de prières.

The earliest mention of Bingnen is in 1421, Buignen in 1428, and Bignen in 1461. Bignen was formerly part of the deanery of Porhoët, of the fief of the lords of Rohan.

The town church was constructed between 1787 and 1801 with construction interrupted by the French Revolution.

Bignan was a very active center of chouannerie from 1794 by the action of Pierre Guillemot, called "the king of Bignan", lieutenant of Georges Cadoudal.

After the revolution Castle Kerguéhennec, sometimes nicknamed the " Versailles breton", served as a warehouse for the Chouans to remove crops to the law of requisition of grain applied by the Republican administration.

In 1906, traces of an Iron Age settlements and in particular of the Acheulean period were found near the town.

At the start of the 2016 academic year, 49 students were enrolled in the Catholic bilingual stream (22% of children in the commune enrolled in primary school)

== Name ==
The meaning of the towns toponym is obscure. Several hypotheses exist:

- A Beg (either Beg-Hent - Beg-nein : end of the road or Naizin) but the nasalisation of Breton seems to oppose it.
- A similar origin ("little Bethany ")
- A Breton origin via the term Bedun meaning birch which is called beg beu today, there is actually a locality, the Bézo, which could confirm (bezo = birches)
- An idea of height based on the Celtic radicals benn (Benian) and penn = height (approximation with pign: pignein (to rise). The village is indeed located on a height.

In Breton the city is named Begnen. The municipality signed the charter Ya d'ar brezhoneg on 20 November 2009.

== Population ==
Historical population
Year	Pop.	±% p.a.
1968	2,067	—
1975	2,227	+1.07%
1982	2,446	+1.35%
1990	2,567	+0.61%
1999	2,546	−0.09%
2007	2,607	+0.30%
2012	2,757	+1.13%
2017	2,791	+0.25%
2023	2,757	−0.20%
Source: INSEE

Inhabitants of Bignan are called Bignanais in French.

== Landmarks ==
=== Catholic Church ===
The Saint-Pierre-et-Saint-Paul church is a Catholic church located in Bignan. It is dedicated to the apostles Peter and Paul.

The building was built at the end of the 18th century on the site of a ruined Romanesque church. On the initiative of the rector of the time, Pierre Nourry, and following his plans, the construction of a new church was begun in 1787.

The first stone was laid on 19 August 1787, but construction was interrupted during the French Revolution and the exile of Abbot Nourry, refractory, work resumed in 1801. Pierre Nourry is buried there at his death in 18043. New bells are melted for the church and received in 1807. The bell tower is built between 1824 and 1857. The church - with the sacristy, the furniture that is integrated and the placier - is registered as a historic monument by order of 23 February 2016.

=== Cross of Tenuel ===
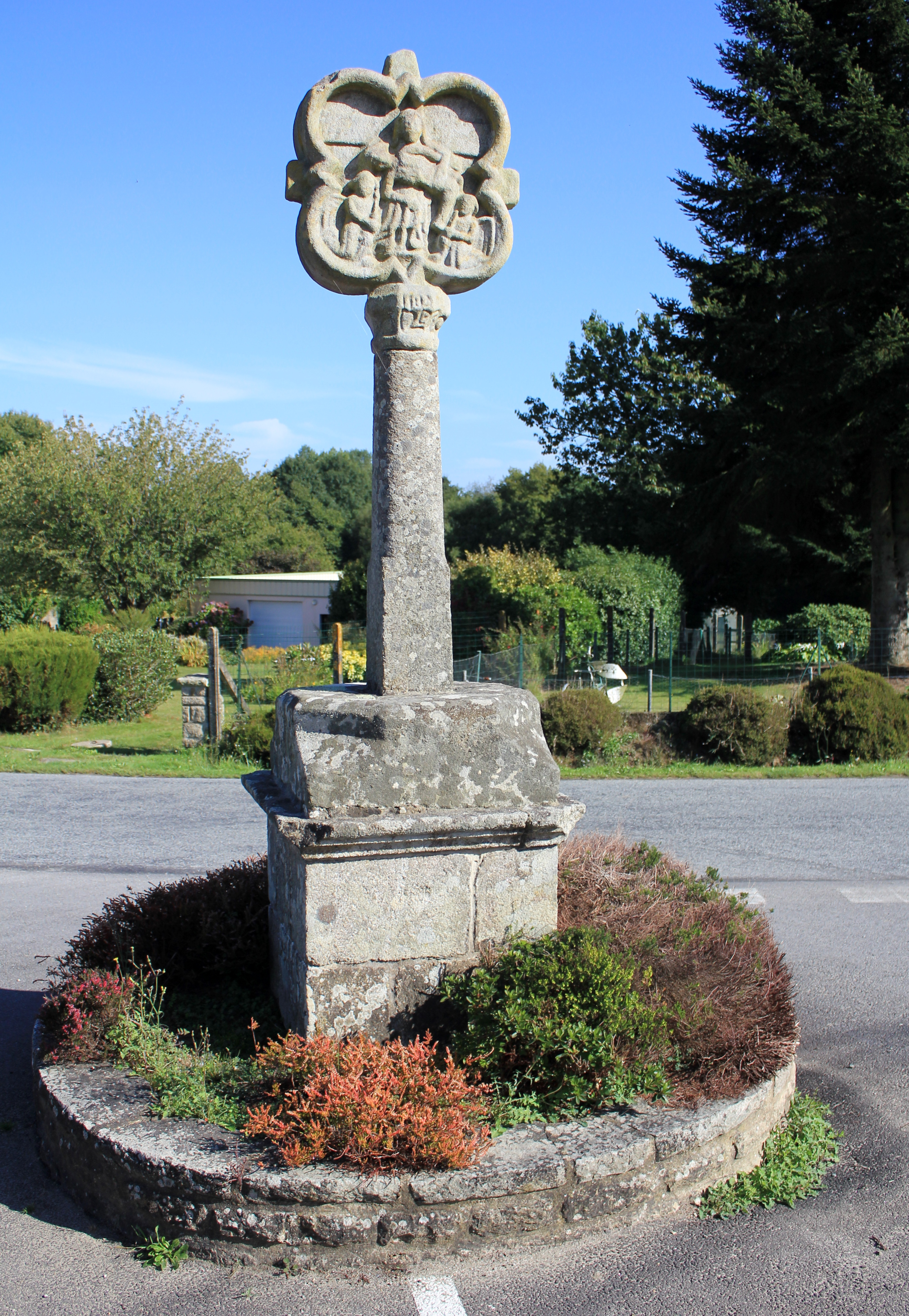
Croix de Treuliec

The Cross of Tenuel is located at a place called "Treuliec" in Bignan in Morbihan in the center of the town of Bignan (French department of Morbihan). The cross is of seventeenth century origin, rebuilt in 1897 and the cross has a medallion with four leaves representing the crucifixion on the front and a pietà verso. The plinth is carved. The cross is the subject of an inscription as a historical monument since 5 April 1935.

=== Village Cross ===
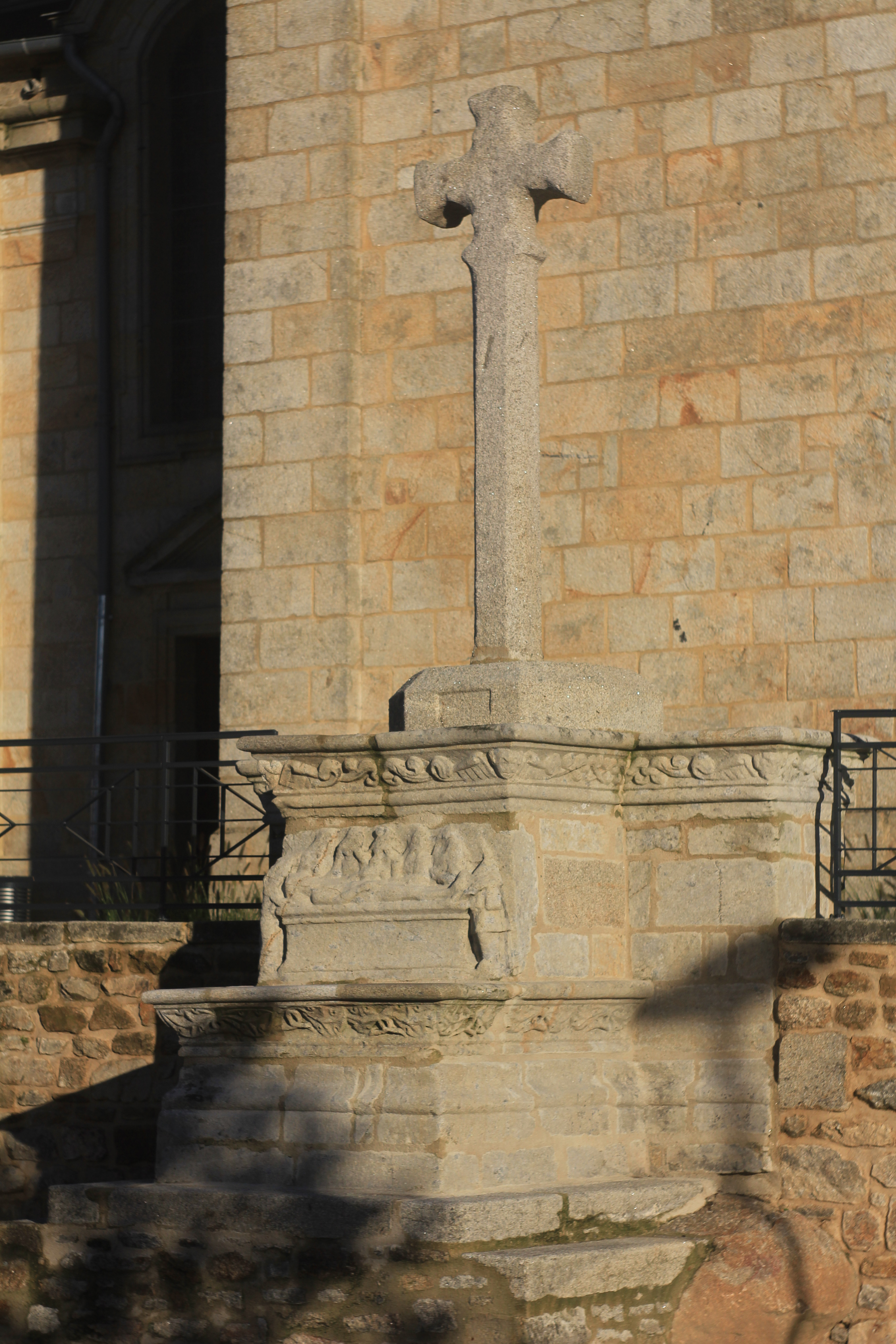
Croix du bourg de Bignan

The cross of the village of Bignan is located in Bignan, near the south transept of the church.

The cross has been registered as a historical monument since 29 March 1935. The basement is an altar which is accessed by two steps. It is surmounted by a patted cross.

=== Fontaine Saint-Éloi ===
The fountain has been listed as a historic monument since 18 October 1944. The niche is surmounted by a shell. Access to the pool is via two steps.

=== Château de Kerguéhennec ===
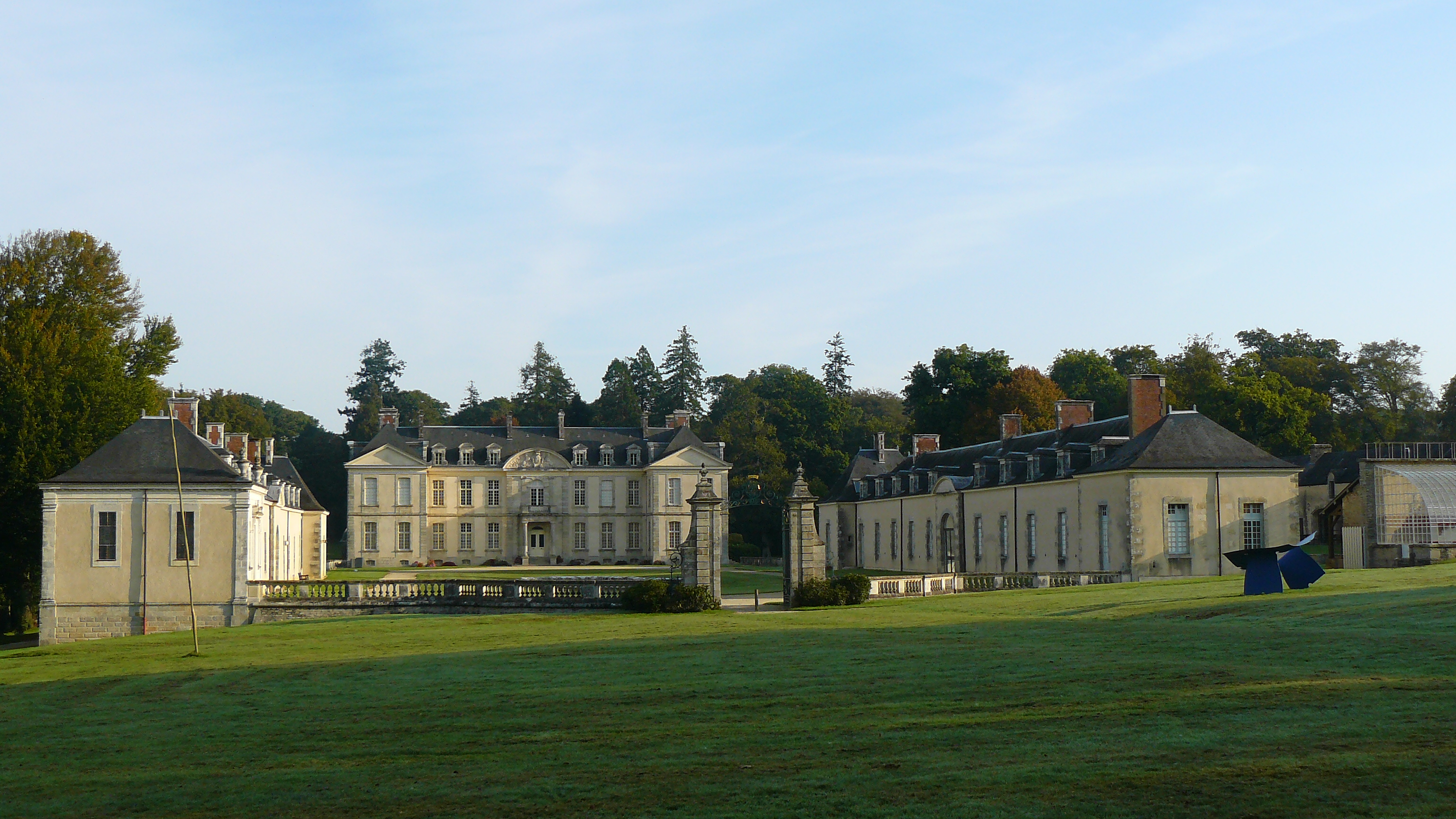
Château de Kerguéhennec

Château de Kerguéhennec, nicknamed the Versailles of Breton, is an 18th-century castle located in Bignan. Today it houses a contemporary art center and a cultural meeting center. This castle has been classified and registered as a historical monument since October 1988.

=== Allée couverte de Kergonfalz ===
The Allée couverte de Kergonfalz is a stone structure near the town. The building is located at the crossroads of the Moustoir-Ac road and the road to the hamlet of Kergonfalz. It is located approximately 470 m as the crow flies to the north of the latter and 200 m southwest of the hamlet of Kergal1. About 50 m to the west, on the other side of the Moustoir-Ac road, stands the Kergonfalz dolmen.

The covered alley dates from the Neolithic, around 3000 to 2700 BC. The structure is classified as historical monuments by order of 10 January 1970.

== Breton language ==
In 2008, 17.36% of primary-school children attended bilingual schools.

== See also ==
- Communes of the Morbihan department
- Henri Gouzien, sculptor of Bignan War Memorial
