= Invasion of France (1795) =

1795 invasion of France by counterrevolutionaries

- Part of the War of the First Coalition
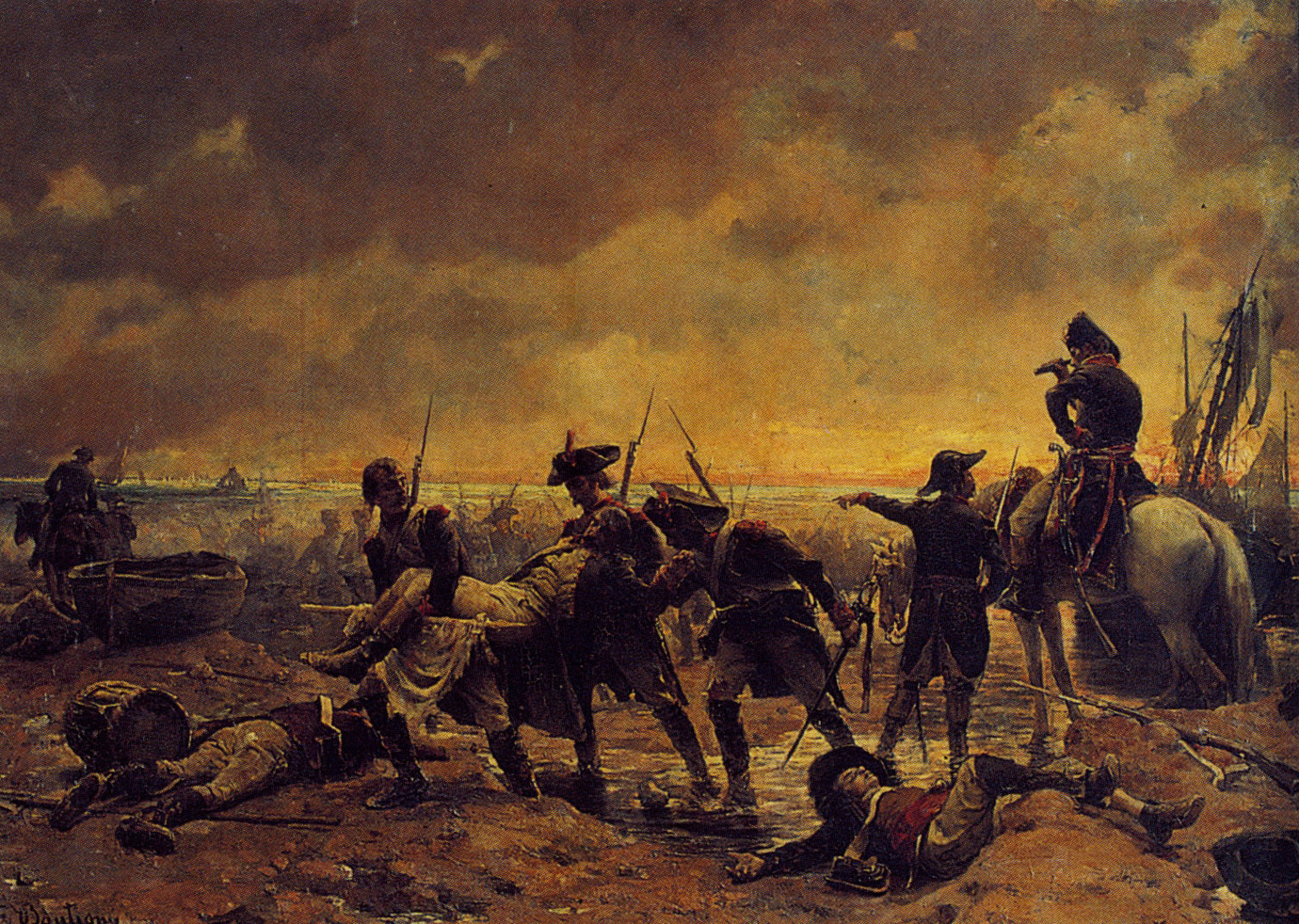
- An episode of the Quiberon affair Paul-Émile Boutigny, 1881
Date	23 June – 21 July 1795
Location	Quiberon, France
Result	French Republican victory

Belligerents
(France) French Republic	(Kingdom of France) French Royalists: Chouans; Armée des Émigrés; Great Britain

Commanders and leaders
(France) Lazare Hoche (France) Jean Baptiste Canclaux	(Kingdom of France) Joseph-Geneviève de Puisaye (Kingdom of France) Louis Charles d'Hervilly (DOW) (Kingdom of France) Georges Cadoudal (Kingdom of France) Charles de Sombreuil (executed) (Kingdom of France) Vincent de Tinténiac † (Kingdom of Great Britain) Alexander Hood (Kingdom of Great Britain) John Borlase Warren

Strength
13,000 men	15,000 Chouans; 5,437 émigrés 80 cannons 9 British warships 60 transports

Casualties and losses
Unknown	Around 5,000 dead and 6,332 captured

The invasion of France (also known as the Battle of Quiberon) was a major landing on the Quiberon peninsula by émigré, counter-revolutionary troops in support of the Chouannerie and Vendée Revolt, beginning on 23 June and finally definitively repulsed on 21 July. It aimed to raise the whole of western France in revolt, bring an end to the French Revolution and restore the French monarchy. The invasion failed; it had a major negative impact, dealing a disastrous blow to the royalist cause.

== Background ==
As a result of the French Revolution, many French royalists fled to Britain, including the Count of Provence and the Count of Artois. The two men divided royalist activities between them, with the Count of Provence handling royalist affairs in southern France, and the Count of Artois handling such efforts in western France. Joseph de Puisaye, a nobleman and military veteran, fled to Britain in 1794, where he entered into negotiations with Count of Artois. Puisaye also negotiated with British Prime Minister William Pitt the Younger in London, requesting Britain's support for a royalist invasion of France. He planned for the invasion to incite the populations of northwest France into rising up against the Republic, as they were mostly royalists, and open a new front of the French Revolutionary Wars; Puisaye even went so far as to claim that he already had an army of 40,000 men under his command in Brittany.

In his negotiations with Pitt, Puisaye convinced him to support the invasion, which he volunteered to lead, requesting men, money and materiel from the British government. Pitt approved of Puisaye's proposal, referring to him as a "clear and sensible man," as did William Windham, Secretary of State at War and a key interlocutor with the royalists. Secretary of State for War Henry Dundas, however, took a more negative view of the invasion. Puisaye also managed to convince the Count of Artois, who appointed him as the general-in-chief of royalist forces in Brittany on 15 October. Pitt promised Puisaye that the invasion would take place in the spring of next year. However, tensions soon developed when a London-based representative of royalists operating on the Count of Provence's behalf in Paris discredited Puisaye, aiming to have Louis Charles d'Hervilly appointed as leader of the invasion instead.

In the end, Puisaye was provided with ships and equipment by the British government, but no soldiers. There were several issues which plagued the invasion before it even began: along with the power struggle between Puisaye and d'Hervilly, there were on the day of the invasion only 3,500 of the 15,000 troops Puisaye had intended to lead, and several royalists insisted on landing at the Vendée instead of Brittany (this suggestion was mostly due to François de Charette's insistence, as Charette also intended to become leader of the invasion instead of Puisaye. The invasion's leaders planned to land at Quiberon, which proved difficult as it consisted of a merely a narrow strip of land, with its shoals blocking access to part of the coastline. Many of the royalist soldiers which participated in the invasion were conscripted Republican prisoners of war of dubious loyalty, further complicating matters.

== The expedition ==
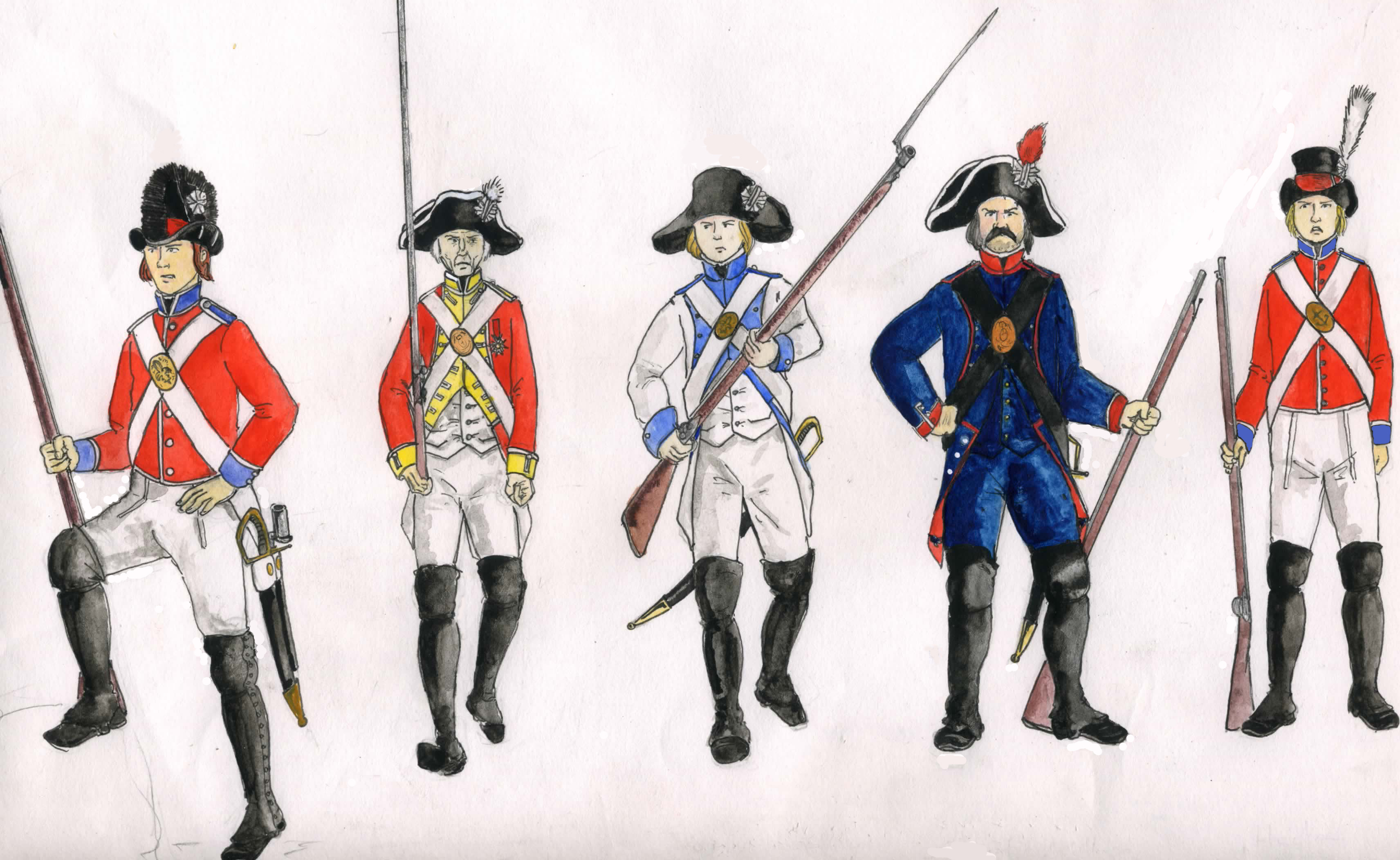
Five Royalist soldiers (left to right): Dresnay Regiment, Loyal Emigrant Regiment, Hervilly Regiment, Royal Artillery and Royal Marine Regiment

=== Naval crossing ===
On 23 June two squadrons of nine warships (including three ships of the line and two frigates) and 60 troop transports (carrying two émigré divisions, totalling 3,500 men and the British 90th, 19th, 27th Regiments of Foot, as well as muskets, uniforms, shoes, food and supplies for an army of at least 40,000) set out under the command of British admirals Hood and Warren. Villaret-Joyeuse left Brest and attacked Warren's squadron above Îles de Glénan on 23 June 1795, but was forced to retire quickly towards the île de Groix and lost two ships of the line. Linois lost an eye in this encounter, and the British retained naval superiority for the rest of the expedition.

=== Divisions ===
On 26 June 1795, the squadrons anchored off Quiberon and could at this point have begun to disembark their troops. However, it was at this point that comte Louis Charles d'Hervilly took out his letter of nomination and claimed supreme command of the expedition. The two officers were not even operating the same plan - Puisaye wanted to take advantage of the element of surprise and attack immediately to relieve Royalist troops throughout western France, but d'Hervilly thought the Chouans were undisciplined and incapable of holding out in open battle, and so planned to remain at Quiberon, fortifying it for use as a base and for pouring in reinforcements. The division was not only strategic but political - Puisaye was a former Girondin, favouring the establishment of a constitutional monarchy, whereas d'Hervilly wished for the wholesale reinstatement of the Ancien Régime. A whole day was lost in heated discussions between the two of them, and a courier was even sent to London to confirm who was to be supreme commander. Hervilly finally submitted, but the delay lost them the vital element of surprise and allowed the Republican troops of the armée des côtes de Brest to gather themselves, with the émigré troops demonstrating their impatience and astonishment at this inexplicable delay, and with their subsequent early successes proving illusory. As for the Chouan Bretons gathered by Georges Cadoudal, they already suspected a betrayal and the delay only confirmed them in this, with a disastrous effect on morale.

=== Disembarkation ===
On the morning of 27 June, the weather cleared after two days of mist and the Republican forces spotted the British ships in Quiberon bay, with the fort at Penthièvre signalling all day to Quiberon, "They are disembarking en grande force." A British frigate cruised to the eastern point of Belle-Île and a British brig and cutter cruised to its western point, and in the evening another frigate joined the first at the east, anchoring beside it - thus Belle-Île was blockaded.

On 27 June, the British disembarked 8,000 troops at Carnac, and summoned Belle-Île to surrender, which it was unwilling to do. The disembarkation happened without difficulty, since the garrison of Auray had been beaten by the Chouans, who had also taken Carnac, Landévant and Locoal-Mendon, putting the coast in Royalist hands.

Fort Penthièvre, known as Fort Sans-culotte by the Republicans, blocked the route to the north of the island and was held by 700 men of the 41e de ligne (commanded by Delize) but it put up only an insignificant resistance and surrendered on 3 July. The Royalist troops thus linked up with the Chouans as foreseen and the villages were occupied, but none of the combined force's operations was put into action by Joseph de Puisaye quickly enough to disquiet the Republicans.

=== Republican counter-attack ===
Divisions among the Royalist command greatly profited the Republicans, leaving the disembarked troops scattered. Lazare Hoche (then at Vannes) had only 2,000 men under his command but headed for Quiberon, sending for urgent reinforcements en route, and by 4 July had an army of 13,000 men, not having been slowed down by the Chouans in the interior. In Ille-et-Vilaine, Aimé du Boisguy, with 5,000 men, had enough men to stop Hoche's advance, but he had not even been informed of the landing and was only able to meet him in minor clashes. On 5 July clashes occurred at Landevant and Auray, with Hoche defeating Chouans under Vauban and Bois-Berthelot.

Hoche thus arrived at Quiberon unimpeded and turned Carnac into a trap, recapturing it on 6 July and on 7 July re-taking nearly the whole peninsula. The Chouan divisions placed ahead of Joseph de Puisaye's positions were swept aside, having not been merged into the Royalist divisions. The comte d'Hervilly did not deign to support them in good time and despite fierce assaults the Republican encirclement could not be broken.

=== Royalist reaction ===
On 10 and 11 July, the Royalists launched a plan to break through the Republican lines. Two Chouan columns, one of 2,500 men under Lantivy and Jean Jan and the other of 3,500 men under Tinténiac and Cadoudal, would embark on British ships and land at Sarzeau. The Chouans, wearing British-supplied uniforms, had the task of attacking the Republican lines from the rear. However, the first column dispersed and the second was ready to attack but was met by chevalier Charles de Margadel with news from the Royalist alliance in Paris of a new landing near Saint-Brieuc and diverted towards the Côtes-d'Armor against Cadoudal's advice. Tinténiac was killed in an ambush on 17 July and no further landing took place to reinforce them. Angered at this, the Chouans discarded their uniforms and, led by Cadoudal, managed to evade the Republican troops and get back to their homes.

In the meantime, on 15 July, 2,000 more émigré soldiers, commanded by Charles Eugène Gabriel de Sombreuil landed at Quiberon as reinforcements. The émigrés, then the Chouans, thus launched new offensives but were beaten back, with Louis Charles d'Hervilly mortally wounded in the attack and émigré losses already risen to 1,500 dead.

=== The assault on Quiberon ===
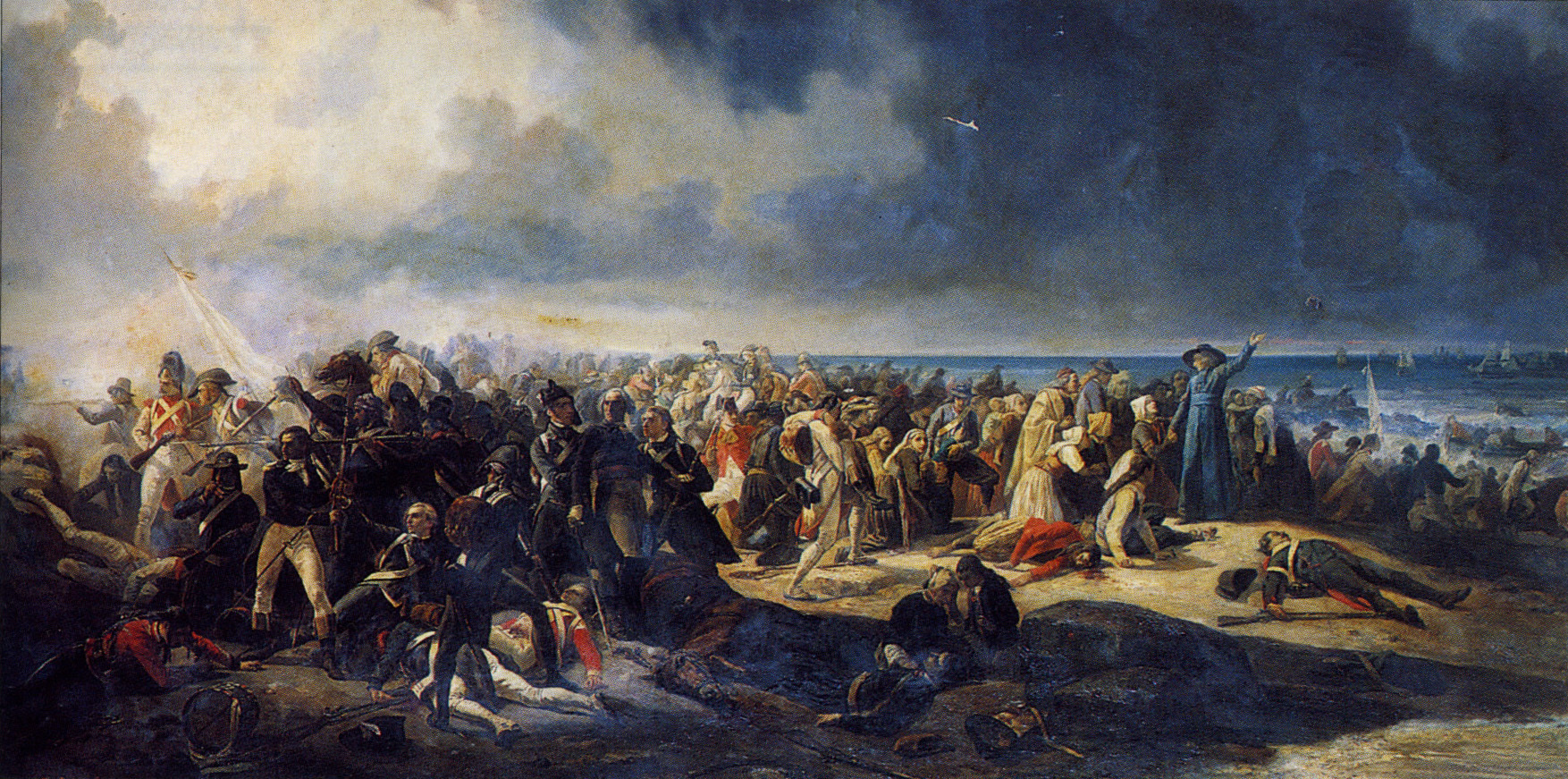
Combat de Quiberon en 1795, painting by Jean Sorieul

Lazare Hoche thus ordered a decisive assault on the night of 20 July against the fort de Penthièvre and its garrison of 4,000 men, despite a violent storm and the fort being covered by British warships offshore. However, Republican prisoners brought over as part of the Royalist force deserted and delivered the fort to Hoche by treachery, with many of its defenders being massacred by Hoche's troops. The British warships then opened fire on the fort, but were unable to inflict significant casualties on the Republican troops. Joseph de Puisaye judged the situation hopeless and ordered his men to re-embark onto the admiral's flagship so as to limit the extent of the Royalist defeat and so, despite his later being accused of deserting to save his own life, 2,500 émigré and Chouan troops were evacuated in British rowing-boats.

Only Sombreuil and his men, cornered as they were, stood in the way of the Republican advance and they put up a last resistance. However, on the morning of 21 July Hoche and Sombreuil began negotiations and the Royalists capitulated shortly afterwards, apparently with the promise that the lives of all the Royalist troops would be spared.

== Massacre of the Royalist prisoners ==
6,332 Chouans and émigrés were captured, along with members of their family. Lazare Hoche verbally promised that the Royalists would be treated as prisoners of war, but this promise was not kept. The women and children were freed a few days after the battle, but the soldiers were charged by commissaire Jean-Lambert Tallien. Charles de Virot, Marquis de Sombreuil and 750 of his companions were condemned by a military tribunal and shot by firing squad at Auray. 430 of these were nobles, many of whom had served in the fleet of Louis XVI. The site of the execution is known as the Champ des martyrs, and those shot there remained buried on the site until 1814. In 1829, an expiatory chapel was built there in the form of a temple.

The Chartreuse at Auray holds the list of prisoners, printed quickly, and a vault with the remains of 952 prisoners from the Royal army who died between 1 and 25 August 1795 after the defeat of the Quiberon landings.

== In literature ==
- One chapter of Mr. Midshipman Hornblower (adapted for television as The Frogs and the Lobsters) was based on this landing.
- In The Black Moon, the fifth novel of the Poldark saga by Winston Graham, Ross Poldark uses the landing to spring his friend Dwight Enys from prison in Quimper.
- The Marquis of Carabas, also known as The Master-at-Arms, by Rafael Sabatini, uses the incident as historical background for this novel.
- The battle of Quiberon is featured in Sir Isumbras at the Ford, a historical novel by D. K. Broster.

== Sources ==
- Abbé Angot, Quiberon, du 6 juin au 25 juillet 1795, in Revue historique et archéologique du Maine, t. XLI (1897), p. 335–347 (in French)
- L'Affaire de Quiberon
- Quiberon in the Napoleonic guide
