= Pierre Guillemot =

Chouan Military Leader

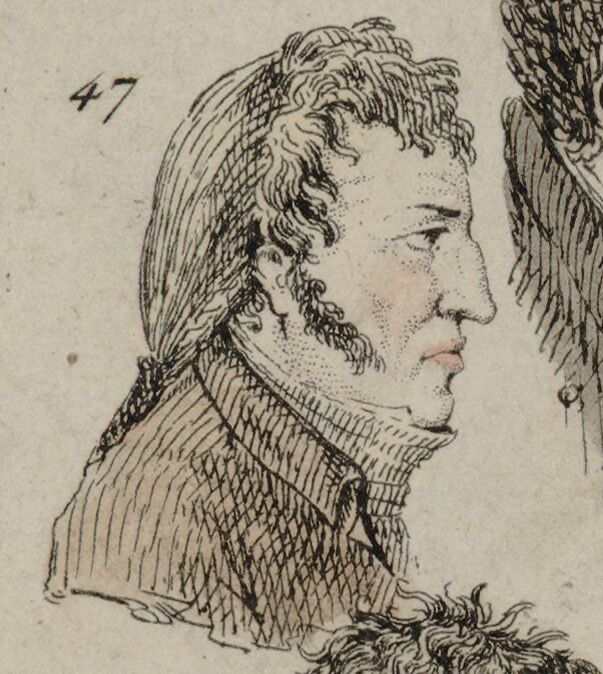
Pierre Guillemot, Portrait after reports made by the Paris police, 1800–1804.

Pierre Guillemot (French: [pjɛʁ ɡijmo]), called "the King of Bignan" was a military leader in Brittany after the French Revolution.

Pierre Guillemot was born on 1 November 1759 at a place called Kerdel, in Bignan, and died on 5 January 1805 in Vannes.

As a Chouan military leader who held Republican troops in respect of a large part of Morbihan from year 1794 to 1800. He is the father of Julien Guillemot.

== Career ==
He was at the beginning of the Revolution only a simple farmer from Donnan, hamlet of Plumelec. He was, however, a scholar since he had begun studies in Vannes, which he had to abandon when his father died to keep the land of Kerdel. Recruited by Georges Cadoudal, he began his career with the occupation of Grand Champ, the felling of the Tree of Liberty, the seizure of the tax office and the release of a refractory priest, Father Leclerc, rector of Saint-Jean-Brévelay. The latter was being forced to Josselin by eighty Republicans with about thirty peasants, Guillemot attacked the escort in the Colledo wood at Guéhenno, puts them to flight and frees the vicar who, wounded in the leg, will die a few days later. Joseph of Boulainvilliers Croÿ who deserted the Morbihan and passed in Ille-et-Vilaine in September with 50 000 books entrusted by Joseph de Puisaye was arrested by the men of Pierre Guillemot. The latter made him judge by an improvised council of war which condemned him to death: Boulainvilliers was shot by the Chouans de Guillemot on 17 January 1795 in the village of Kerhervy in Saint-Jean-Brévelay.

He showed his great military abilities by dislodging Locminé's blue troops, fighting General Lazare Hoche and trying to prevent General Brune from seizing Vannes in 1799. For his success he was nicknamed the King of Bignan and he became colonel of the Royalist Army and Chief of Legion for the whole department. After an exile in England with Cadoudal, he returned to France and, to liberate Cadoudal, devised a plan which failed. On 13 June 1804 the prefect Jullien was informed by one of his spies that Guillemot had been seen in Plumelec. Hidden from Plaudren, he was arrested soon after. He was tried by a military commission and shot in Vannes on 5 January 1805.

There is an association, Pierre Guillemot whose head office is in Bignan and whose purpose is to safeguard the historical memory of the Chouan chief.
