= Louis Charles d'Hervilly =

French nobleman, military officer and counter-revolutionary

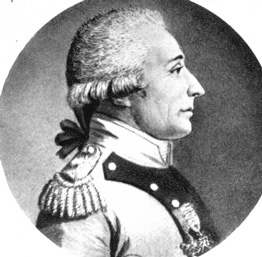
- Louis Charles d'Hervilly
- Born: 26 February 1756; Paris, Kingdom of France
- Died: 14 November 1795 (aged 39) London, Great Britain
- Allegiance: Kingdom of France; Kingdom of France; Armée des émigrés
- Rank: Maréchal de camp
- Conflicts: American Revolutionary War; French Revolution; Insurrection of 10 August 1792; French Revolutionary Wars; Battle of Quiberon

Louis Charles Le Cat, comte d'Hervilly (French pronunciation: [lwi ʃaʁl lə ka, kɔ̃t dɛʁviji]; 26 February 1756 – 14 November 1795) was a French nobleman, military officer and counter-revolutionary. He was one of the leaders of the abortive landing at Quiberon. His daughter married the general Marie-François Auguste de Caffarelli du Falga.

== Life ==
D'Hervilly was born to a noble family in Paris, in 1756. He fought in the American Revolutionary War as an aide-de-camp to Admiral Charles Henri Hector d'Estaing. He later served as a colonel of the Prince of Soubise's infantry, and was promoted to maréchal de camp in 1792.

In 1792, D'Hervilly commanded the cavalry of the short-lived Constitutional Guard of King Louis XVI, and took part in the defence of the Tuileries Palace during the Insurrection of 10 August 1792. Afterwards, he emigrated to Great Britain and joined the Royalist Armée des émigrés.

D'Hervilly re-entered France in June 1795 as one of the leaders of the Quiberon Expedition, an attempted invasion of France by the émigrés, and was mortally wounded during the fighting. He returned to Great Britain after the expedition's defeat, and died in London four months later.

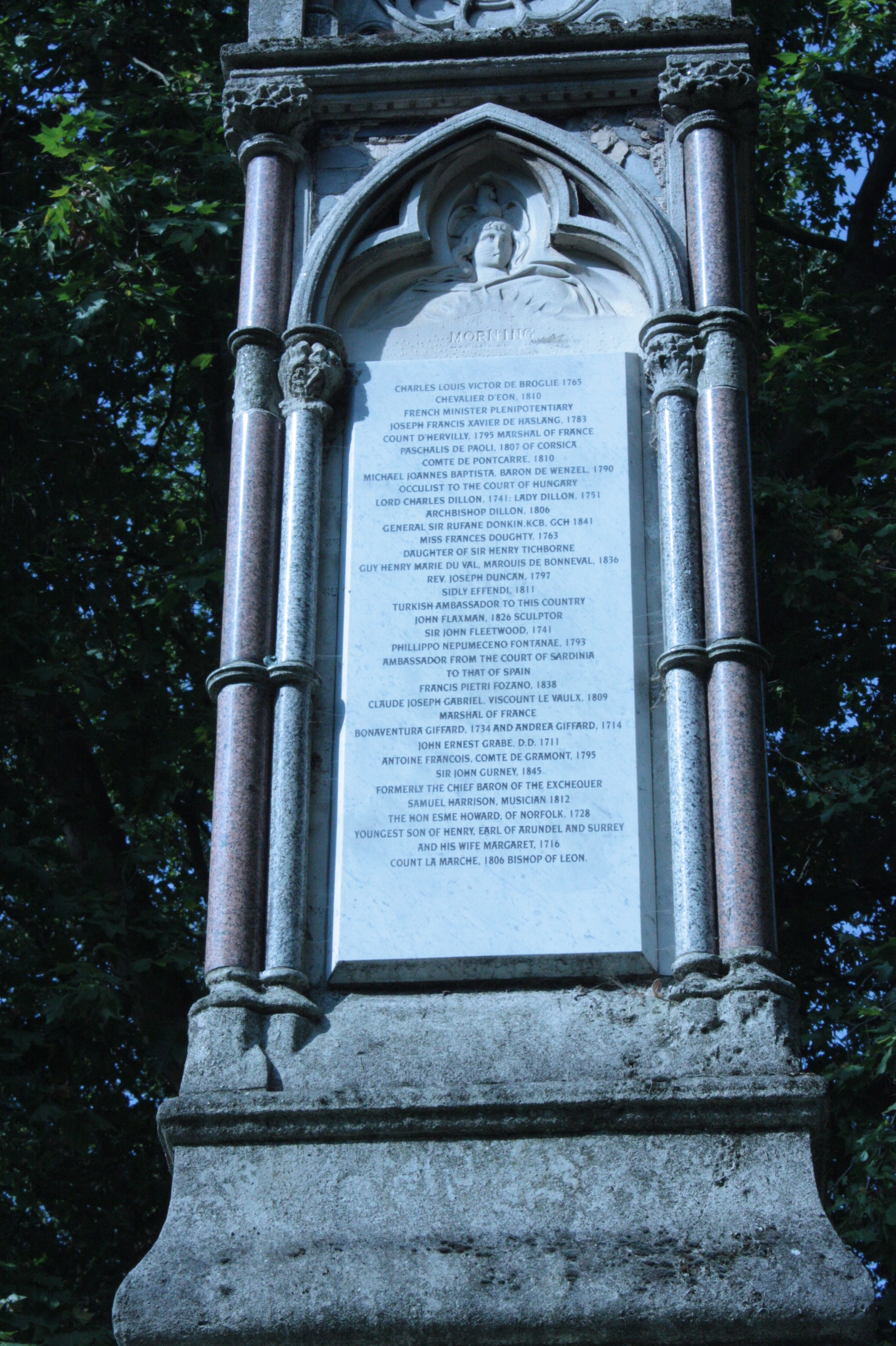
D'Hervilly's name listed on the south face of the Burdett Coutts Memorial

D'Hervilly is listed as one of the persons of note buried in Old St Pancras Churchyard in London on the Burdett-Coutts Memorial in the churchyard to commemorate lost graves therein.

== Bibliography ==
- Annuaire de la noblesse de France, 1880, 1881, B.n.F. : 8° Lc35. 10
- H. Jougla de Morenas (then Comte Raoul de Warren), Grand armorial de France, Paris, 1934–1949, tome : 2, Cote B.n.F. : Fol. Lm1. 209.
- M. Michaud, Biographie universelle ancienne et moderne, T. 19, p. 362 et 363.

== See also ==
- Joseph de Puisaye
