= Joseph-Geneviève de Puisaye =

French nobleman (1755–1827)

Joseph de Puisaye
- Count of Puisaye
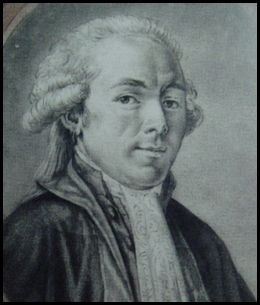
- Born: 6 March 1755; Mortagne-au-Perche, Normandy, France
- Died: 13 September 1827 (aged 72); London, England
- Spouses: Louise Le Sesne; Susanna Smithers

Joseph-Geneviève, comte de Puisaye (6 March 1755 – 13 September 1827) was a minor French nobleman who fought as a counter-revolutionary during the French Revolution, leading two unsuccessful invasions from England. He later led a group of French royalists to settle in Upper Canada, but returned to England after a few years, when that effort proved largely unsuccessful. He remained in England until his death in 1827.

== Before the revolution ==
De Puisaye was born in Mortagne-au-Perche, the fourth son of a French aristocratic family. His family intended for him to join a seminary, and sent him to the Collège de Laval at age nine, then the Collège de Sées and the Séminaire de Saint-Sulpice in Paris. The seminary's superior recommended against a religious vocation for Puisaye when he was seventeen, and he left the seminary. He joined the French Army in 1773 at age eighteen. Family connections through his maternal grandmother allowed Puisaye to obtain a commission as a second lieutenant in a cavalry regiment near the German border in February 1775. He was promoted to supernumerary captain in 1779 in a non-existent company. Unsatisfied with his military career, he returned to Mortagne-au-Perche in 1781 or 1782.

In order to obtain the Order of Saint-Louis, de Puisaye purchased a colonelcy and an honorary position in the King's guard. He married Louise Le Sesne, the sole heiress of the marquis de Ménilles, on 19 June 1788. From this marriage he obtained an estate in Pacy-sur-Eure, Normandy, and he spent his time there or in Paris. There he was involved in drafting the cahier de doléance for the nobility of Perche, and they sent him as their delegate to the Estates General in 1789.

== French Revolution ==
=== A revolutionary becomes a counter-revolutionary ===
In the Estates-General he supported a constitutional monarchy and aligned himself with the Girondins. His liberal reformist political position enabled him to be made the commander of the National Guard in the Évreux district in 1790. He stopped attending the National Constituent Assembly after its first session and was not re-elected in 1792. After the Jacobins outlawed the Girondins in 1793, Puisaye became a counter-revolutionary, but his earlier association with the revolutionaries left him untrusted among more conservative counter-revolutionaries.

In Normandy Puisaye was in command of a local troop of federalists and royalists who were surprised by Republican forces in a July 1793 attack. The troops scattered and De Puisaye went into hiding in the Pertre forest, while his estate was sacked by Republican forces. While in hiding he attempted to organise the Chouans into an anti-Jacobin army, which he hoped to join with other counter-revolutionaries. He happened to intercept communications from England to royalist force leaders, and he responded accordingly. These responses impressed the English, who started supplying Puisaye with money and equipment. Thus bolstered, he began issuing calls for the French army and populace to rebel. Puisaye left for England in 1794 to arrange a royalist invasion with the aim of starting a general insurrection.

=== First French invasion ===
In England, he persuaded the British Prime Minister William Pitt to back an invasion of France to restore the monarchy. Puisaye volunteered to lead the expedition, requesting men, money and materials from the British government. He believed that such an invasion would lead to a general insurrection, which would restore the monarchy. Pitt thought well of Puisaye's proposal, referring to him as a "clear and sensible man." Secretary of State at War William Windham also supported the expedition, and met regularly with Puisaye during its planning. Secretary of State for War Henry Dundas, in contrast, took a more negative view of the proposed expedition. In the end, Puisaye was provided with ships and equipment by the British government, but no soldiers. De Puisaye tried to arrange a force of 15,000 men, but on his invasion date of 8 June 1795 only some 3,500 men appeared.

The force crossed the English Channel, landing on the Quiberon peninsula, where 2,500 men met them, giving Puisaye a total force of 6,000. The force relied on expected support from the peasants, but this was not forthcoming. The British recognised Puisaye as the commander of the force, but French royalist forces recognised the Comte d'Hervilly as the commander of the forces, and internal power struggles plagued the unit. With its leadership divided, the force did little, and republican forces attacked Puisaye's expedition while it was still on the peninsula, unready to fight. The royalists suffered defeat, with thousands of men drowning while trying to escape; those who surrendered were immediately executed. Puisaye escaped to England, claiming the need to save official correspondence, although he was accused of cowardice.

=== Second French invasion ===
Puisaye returned to France in September 1795 to take command of the remaining Chouans. Their forces were in disarray, however, and they intended to make peace with the republican government, so Puisaye returned to England. There he found the French exile community hostile to him, blaming him for his disastrous expeditions and accusing him of cowardice. His offer to support the Comte d'Artois in seeking the French throne was rejected, and Puisaye resigned his position as lieutenant-general in the king's armies.

== Move to Upper Canada ==
In England, Puisaye and his fellow "French émigrés" were supported with public money and private charity, which quickly made them unwelcome. Puisaye proposed leading them to Upper Canada where they would found a French military colony and help defend Upper Canada from republican influences. Puisaye arranged for the French royalists to be settled in Upper Canada on the same terms as the United Empire Loyalists some two decades before. He and forty-one other settlers departed England for Upper Canada in the summer of 1798. It was expected that this expedition would pave the way for the emigration of thousands of French loyalists. On 22 November 1798, the Executive Council of Upper Canada approved land grants for the settlers in Uxbridge, Gwillimbury, Whitchurch and an unnamed county north of Whitby, all in Ontario. Located in present-day Richmond Hill, the new settlement was named Windham in honour of William Windham, the British Secretary of War who help arranged the settlement. Puisaye and surveyor Augustus Jones looked over the land in December 1798.

The settlers encountered significant troubles upon arrival in Canada. They were all French aristocrats, unprepared for life as pioneers. Although the building of the settlement went well at first, the settlers quickly became disillusioned, their unhappiness being expressed openly by the spring of 1799. Puisaye himself expressed his dissatisfaction with the area where the settlers were granted plots to Peter Russell, the administrator of Upper Canada; Russell wrote to Lieutenant Governor John Graves Simcoe that "[Puisaye] now thinks the distance too great for navigation, the roads impracticable, and the consequent difficulties of transport insuperable, and in short that his people are unequal to the hardships of reducing such heavy timbered forests into cultivation. He therefore wishes for some situation on the Lake where the nobles, aged, and women may engage in less laborious occupations." He soon purchased land south of Newark, Ontario, in the Niagara region, where he spent most of his time. He negotiated with Joseph Brant to obtain land to relocate the remaining settlers, but nothing came of these negotiations. Although Puisaye kept up his properties in Windham and tried to support the other settlers, the community languished. Most of the settlers abandoned the project, including Puisaye, who returned to England in May 1802 to find more funding to support the colony. Of all the settlers who came to Upper Canada, only the Chevalier Michel Saigeon remained after the restoration of the French monarchy in 1814. He settled on a farm north of London with his second wife Susanna Smithers, his former housekeeper. There he published a six-volume memoir.

Puisaye died in Hammersmith on 13 September 1827.

== Bibliography ==
- Maurice Hutt, Chouannerie and Counter-Revolution: Puisaye, the Princes and the British Government in the 1790s (2 vols, Cambridge University Press, 1983 – reprinted 2008)
