= 13 Vendémiaire =

1795 battle between French Revolutionary troops and Royalists

- Part of the French Revolution and the War of the First Coalition
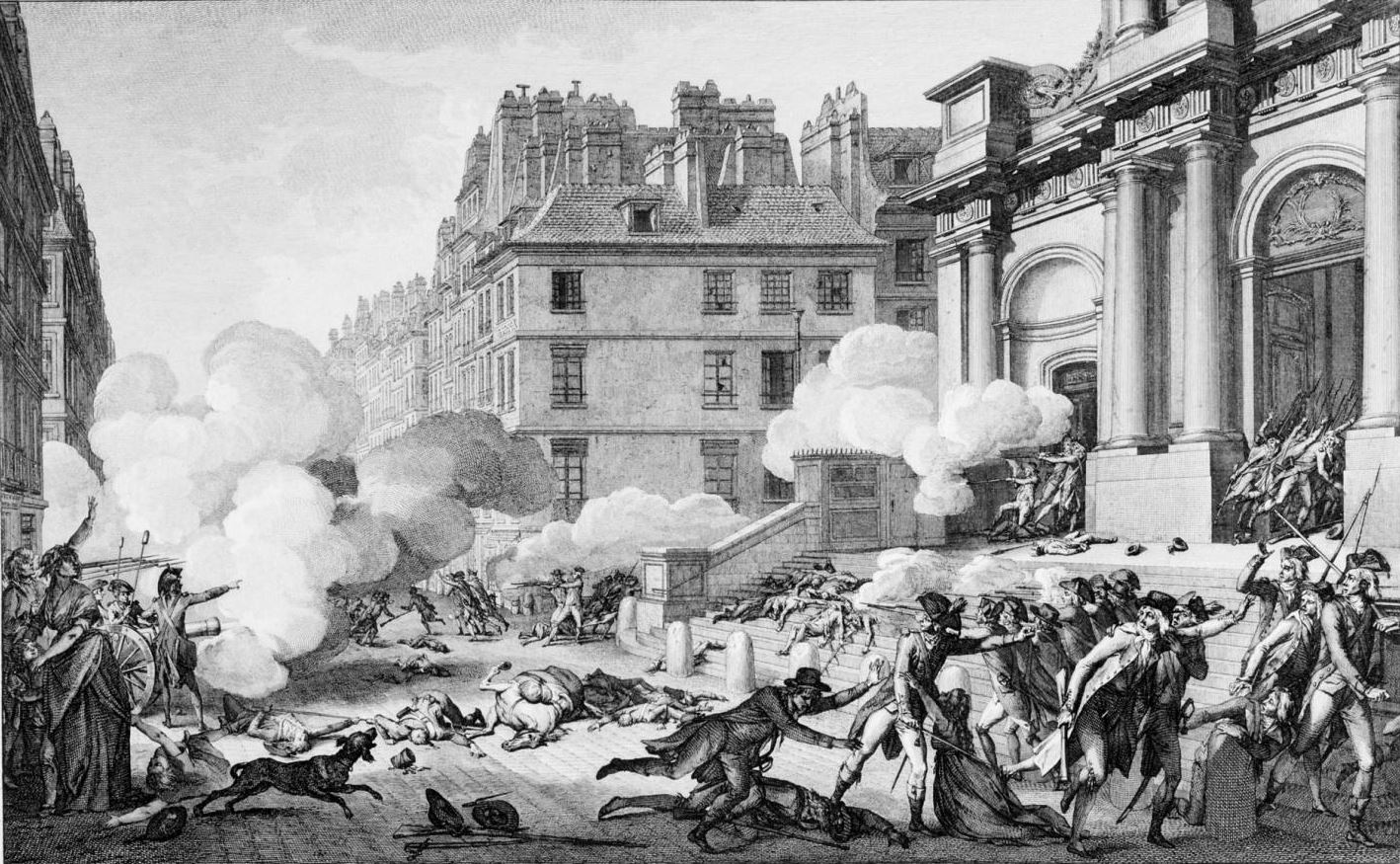
- Charles Monnet's depiction of Napoleon Bonaparte's quelling of the Royalist revolt, 13 Vendémiaire, in front of the Église Saint-Roch
Date	5 October 1795
Location	Paris, France 48.856667°N 2.350987°E
Result	Republican victory

Belligerents
(French First Republic) French Republic	(Kingdom of France) French Royalists

Commanders and leaders
(French First Republic) Napoleon Bonaparte (French First Republic) Paul Barras	(Kingdom of France) Jean-Thomas-Élisabeth Richer de Sérizy (Kingdom of France) Louis Michel Auguste Thévenet

Strength
6,000 total 4,500 regular troops, 1,500 'Patriots', 40 cannons	25,000–30,000

Casualties and losses
90 dead and wounded	300 dead 2 executed
- 400 civilians
- Location within Europe

13 Vendémiaire, Year 4 in the French Republican Calendar (5 October 1795 in the Gregorian calendar), was a battle between the French Revolutionary troops and Royalist forces in the streets of Paris. This battle was part of the establishing of a new form of government, the Directory, and it was a major factor in the rapid advancement of Republican General Napoleon Bonaparte's career.

== Background ==
The social reforms of the French Revolution had been well received by the majority of the populace of France, but the Revolution's strongly anti-Catholic stance had created anti-Republican sympathies in many Roman Catholics. In March 1793, this sentiment boiled over into an armed insurrection in the fiercely Catholic Vendée region of western France. A rebel army titled Armée catholique et royale now proved to be a thorn in the side of the Revolutionary government in Paris, under leaders such as François de Charette de la Contrie and Maurice d'Elbée. The rebels were known as Chouans, a title which comes from early Royalist leader Jean Cottereau's nickname Jean Chouan. The Armée catholique et royale quickly garnered British support and got off to a promising start, severely defeating several Revolutionary Armies. The Revolutionary Committee of Public Safety ordered General Jean-Baptiste Carrier to pacify the region, and over several months Carrier ruthlessly suppressed the Vendée. The local population dubbed Carrier's forces the infernal columns. On 22 December 1793, the Chouan rebellion subsided following a major defeat at the Battle of Savenay.

Following the 9th Thermidor, those Chouans willing to lay down arms were granted amnesty by the reformed National Convention. The Chouans responded by attacking the Republican-held town of Guémené-sur-Scorff on 28 January 1795. The Convention immediately ordered General Louis Lazare Hoche to proceed to the Vendée and force the Chouans to agree to a cessation of hostilities. Hoche quickly defeated the Chouan army and on 17 February François de Charette de la Contrie signed a very generous peace settlement. A small contingent of Royalists under the command of General Jean-Nicolas Stofflet and the fanatical Etienne-Alexandre Bernier refused to accept the peace settlement and continued to offer resistance to Hoche's army. They were supported by the British in the form of 4,000 émigrés. This large force was placed under the command of émigré Générals Joseph de Puisaye and Hermilly. Hearing of this, de Charette de la Contrie broke the peace agreement and reopened hostilities. On 26 June, the émigré force landed at Carnac. Hermilly quickly advanced on Auray before engaging and being defeated by Hoche at Vannes. By early July, Hermilly had been forced out of Auray and was besieged in the Fortress of Penthièvre. This meant that the entire insurgent army was now trapped on the Quiberon peninsula. On 15 July, an additional émigré division arrived to bolster the defense, under the command of Général Charles François de Virot de Sombreuil, but Hermilly was killed in action on 16 July. By the 20th, the fortress had fallen and Hoche swiftly advanced down the peninsula, defeating the hopelessly trapped émigré army. Only Général Puisaye and a small force were able to escape with the British fleet; the remainder were killed in action, taken prisoner, or executed.

Despite the failure of the émigré army, de Charette de la Contrie continued to offer resistance. In early September, a popular revolt broke out in the area around Dreux, but it was defeated in battle at Nonancourt. De Charette de la Contrie himself suffered a major defeat at Saint-Cyr on 25 September. Despite this, the Comte d'Artois landed at Île d'Yeu with 1,000 émigrés and 2,000 British troops. Bolstered by this force, the Royalist troops began marching on Paris in early October 1795. The arrival of the Comte d'Artois excited the jeunesse dorée Royalist supporters in the Le Peletier section of the capital (named for the Rue Le Peletier in what is now the Second Arrondissement), and they began demonstrations in the form of felling Liberty Trees and trampling cockades of France. Rumours began to circulate regarding the likely defection of the entire Paris National Guard.

== Vendémiaire ==
The Convention quickly realised that it was in severe danger, and that an enemy force was on French soil; indeed, the insurrection in Paris meant that there was now an enemy force within the capital itself. The Convention declared its intention to remain in their meeting rooms until the crisis was resolved. It called for the formation of three battalions of Patriots to be raised from the Jacobin military staff dismissed after 9 Thermidor. Général Jean-François, baron de Menou was given command of the defence of the capital, but he was severely outnumbered with only 5,000 troops on hand to resist the Royalist army of 25,000 men.

On 12 Vendémiaire (4 October 1795), the National Guard arrived in Le Peletier in an attempt to put down the unrest. The Military Committee of the Sections of the Capital under the command of Jean-Thomas-Élisabeth Richer de Sérizy announced that the decrees of the convention were no longer recognised. Général Louis Michel Auguste Thévenet (called Danican) took command of the National Guard in the Le Peletier section. The Convention ordered Menou to advance into Le Peletier, to disarm the entire area, and to close Danican's headquarters. Generals Despierres and Verdière were sent to Menou to assist him. Menou divided his force into three columns and planned an advance into Le Peletier on the evening of 12 Vendémiaire. When the advance was set to begin, Despierres reported that he was unwell and unable to proceed, and Verdière refused to advance. Menou timidly advanced towards the Royalist force, inviting the rebels to discuss terms of their dispersal. He withdrew after receiving the insurgents' promise to disarm.

The Le Peletier section, seeing this as a sign of weakness on the part of the convention, called upon the other sections of Paris to rise up. Menou realised his mistake, and launched a cavalry attack down the Rue du Faubourg-Montmartre, temporarily clearing the area of Royalists. The Convention dismissed Menou from the command and ordered Paul François Jean Nicolas Barras to take over the defence of the convention.

== Battle ==
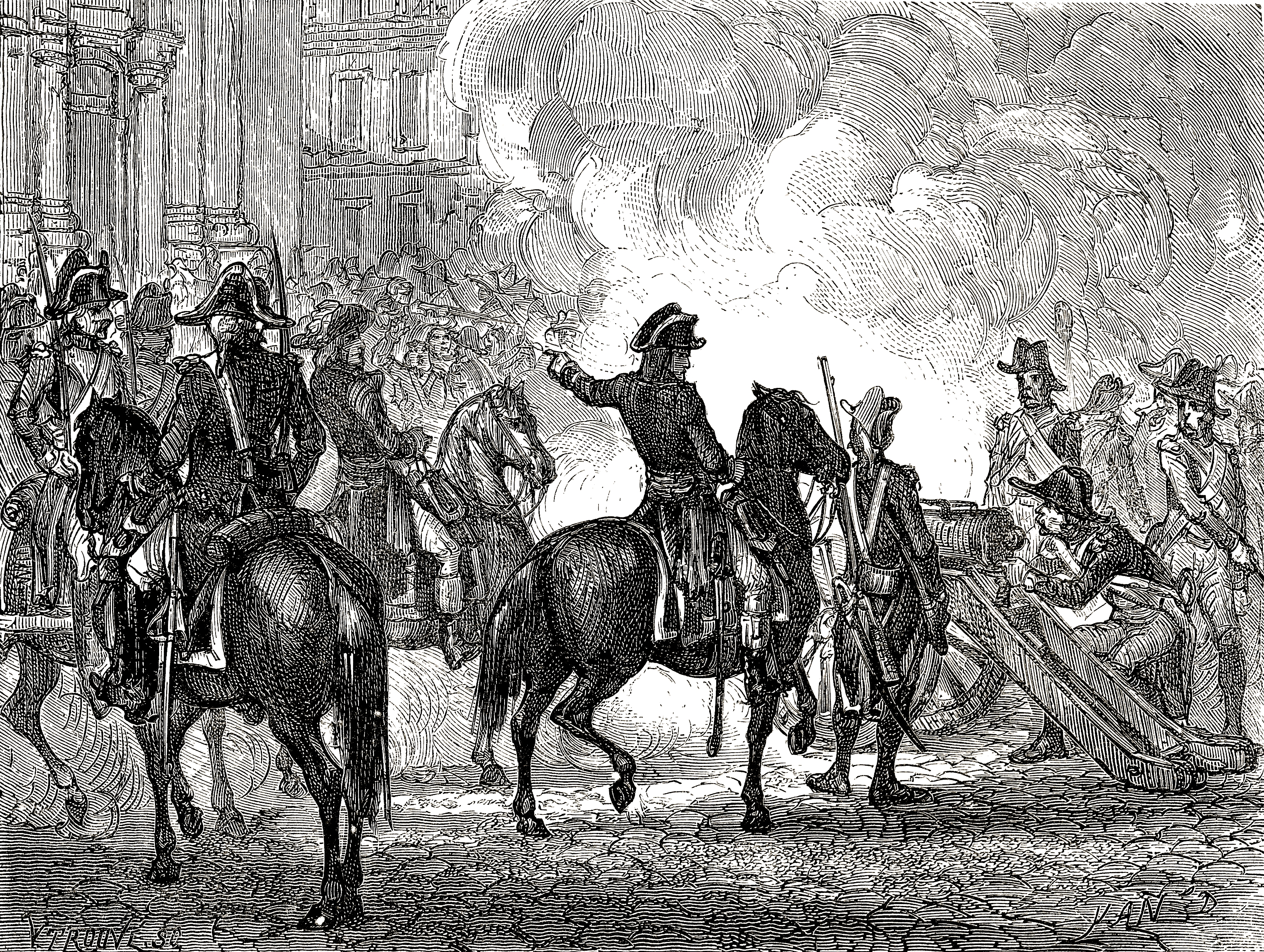
Bonaparte fait tirer à mitraille sur les sectionnaires (Bonaparte orders to shoot at the section members), Histoire de la Révolution, Adolphe Thiers, ed. 1866, design by Yan' Dargent

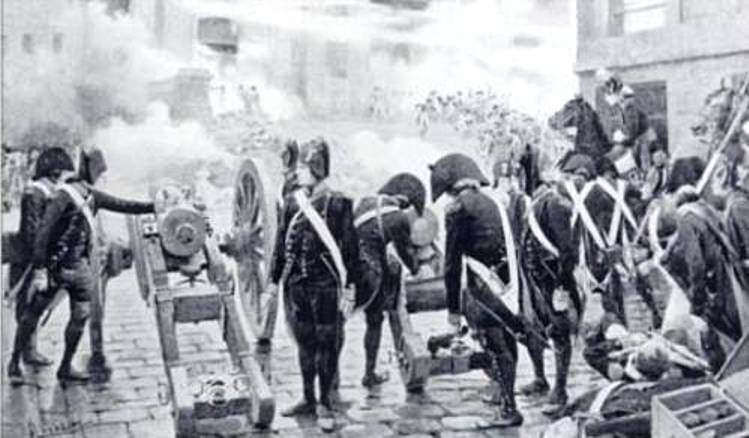
Felician Myrbach's depiction of pro-Convention gunners firing on the Royalist mob

Young General Napoleon Bonaparte was aware of the commotion, and he arrived at the Convention around this time to find out what was happening. He was quickly ordered to join Barras' forces mustering for the defence of the Republic. Bonaparte accepted, but only on the condition that he was granted complete freedom of movement.

At 1 am on 13 Vendémiaire (5 October), Bonaparte overrode Barras, who was content to let him do as he wished. Bonaparte ordered Joachim Murat, a sous-lieutenant in the 12ème Régiment de Chasseurs à Cheval, to ride to the plain of Sablons and to return with the 40 cannon which Menou had indicated were located there. Murat's squadron retrieved the cannons before the Royalists arrived and Bonaparte organised their arrangement, placing them in commanding areas with effective fields of fire.

The Republican forces were outnumbered approximately 6 to 1, but they held their perimeter all the same. At 5 am, a probing attack by the Royalist forces was repulsed. Five hours later, the major Royalist assault by 7,000 men began. The Republican forces held their perimeter, the cannons firing grapeshot into the massed Royalist forces. The Patriot battalions supporting the artillery also cut down the advancing Royalist ranks. Bonaparte commanded throughout the two-hour engagement, and survived unscathed despite having his horse shot from under him. The effect of the grapeshot and the volleys from the Patriot forces caused the Royalist attack to waver. Bonaparte ordered a counterattack led by Murat's squadron of chasseurs. At the close of the battle, around three hundred Royalists lay dead on the streets of Paris.

Scottish philosopher and historian Thomas Carlyle later famously recorded that, on this occasion, Bonaparte gave his opponent a "Whiff of Grapeshot" and that "the thing we specifically call French Revolution is blown into space by it." That is, 13 Vendémiaire marks the ending of the French Revolution. (The phrase is often ascribed to Bonaparte himself, but the words are probably Carlyle's.)

== Aftermath ==
The defeat of the Royalist insurrection extinguished the threat to the convention. On 19 October all the officers in the army, also the ones who were dismissed, had to prove for the Committee of Public Safety where they were on the days around 13 Vendémiaire. On Sunday 25 October the National Convention declared itself dissolved and voted for a general amnesty for "deeds exclusively connected with the Revolution". Not long after the Directoire and Council of Five Hundred was installed; the Committee of Public Safety disappeared. Napoleon was appointed as General in Chief of the Army of the Interior. Bonaparte became a national hero, and was quickly promoted to Général de Division. Within five months, he was given command of the French army conducting operations in Italy. The defeated Royalists, in an effort to portray the Republican defense as a massacre, nicknamed Bonaparte Général Vendémiaire, a title which he later claimed would be his first title of glory.

== In film ==
Abel Gance portrayed 13 Vendémiaire in act iii of his silent production Napoléon. The first episode of the 2002 miniseries Napoléon portrays the battle of 13 Vendémiaire. The events are also depicted in the 2023 film Napoleon.

== Sources ==
- Asprey, Robert B. – The Rise of Napoleon Bonaparte, 604 pages, ISBN 0-465-04881-1
- Chandler, David G. – Campaigns of Napoleon, 1216 pages, ISBN 0-02-523660-1
- Franceschi, M. Gen (ret.) – The 13 Vendémiaire, republican coronation of Napoleon
- Hibbert, Christopher – The Days of the French Revolution, 384 pages, ISBN 0-688-16978-3
- Israel, Jonathan (2015), Revolutionary Ideas: An Intellectual History of the French Revolution from The Rights of Man to Robespierre, Oxford&Princeton: Princeton University Press, ISBN 978-0691169712
- Lacretelle, Jean-Charles-Dominique. "Account of the 1795 Vendémiaire Uprising", Napoleon: Symbol for an Age, A Brief History with Documents, ed. Rafe Blaufarb (New York: Bedford/St. Martin's, 2008), 33–35.
- Soboul, Albert (1974). The French Revolution: 1787–1799. New York: Random House. ISBN 0-394-47392-2.
