= Jean-Thomas-Élisabeth Richer de Sérizy =

French counter-revolutionary

Jean-Thomas-Élisabeth Richer de Sérizy (1759–1803) was a French counter-revolutionary. He founded the newspaper l'Accusateur public.

Richer de Sérizy was born in Paris to a noble family, and died in London.

He had contracted a marriage of convenience with Mlle Calame de La Prairie, daughter of an actress and the Prince de Conti. She accused him of being violent. Their divorce lasted about ten years, during which she had to pay him a pension. During the Revolution, an anonymous denunciation described him as a "man without morality, known throughout Paris for the depravity of his private life, for his passive antiphysical tastes, and marked by the most revolting incivility (...)."

Arrested on 14 Frimaire Year II (December 4, 1793), he was locked up in Carmes Prison, then in that of Luxembourg. After 9 Thermidor, he was sent to finish his seclusion in the Montprin sanatorium, then at the Belhomme boarding house.

He was released on 6 Vendémiaire Year III (September 27, 1794) and began writing his newspaper L'Accusateur public. He played an important role in the Le Peletier section and coordinated the action of the counter-revolutionary sections on 12 Vendémiaire within a central committee which prepared the Restoration of Louis XVIII of France. The failure of the Royalist Uprising of 13 Vendémiaire Year IV (October 5, 1795) is not attributable to him. Defeated, he was prosecuted but acquitted by the jury of the Seine. He was proscribed again after the Coup of 18 Fructidor Year V (September 4, 1797). With former associates of Philippe Égalité, he frequented the house of Grace Elliott, closely watched by the police of the Directory. He narrowly escaped deportation to Cayenne and eventually took refuge in London, where he died at the age of forty-four.
