= Charles Armand Tuffin, marquis de la Rouërie =

French army officer (1751–1793)

Armand Tuffin de La Rouërie
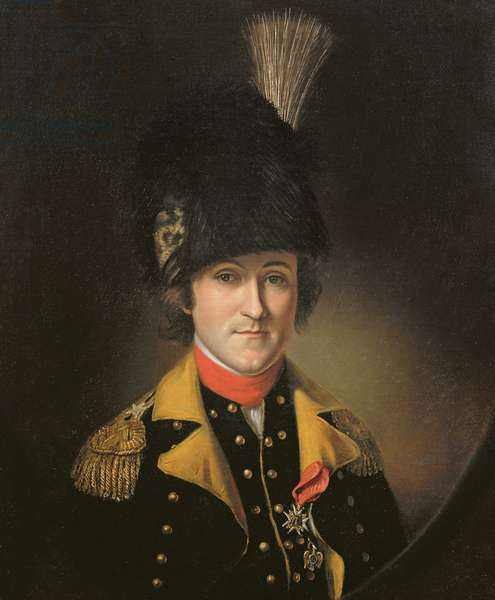
- Portrait by Charles Willson Peale, 1782
- Born: April 13, 1751; Fougères, Brittany, France
- Died: January 30, 1793 (aged 41); Near Lamballe
- Relatives: Marie Eugène Charles Tuffin de La Rouërie (cousin)
- Military career
- Allegiance: Kingdom of France; United States; Chouans
- Branch: French Royal Army; Continental Army
- Rank: Brigadier General
- Nickname: Colonel Armand
- Commands: Pulaski's Legion; Armand's Legion; Head of the Breton Association
- Conflicts: American Revolutionary War; New York and New Jersey Campaign; Battle of the Short Hills; Battle of Brandywine; Battle of White Marsh; Battle of Monmouth; Siege of Yorktown; French Revolutionary Wars; Chouannerie
- Awards: Order of Saint Louis

Charles Armand Tuffin, marquis de la Rouërie (13 April 1751 – 30 January 1793) was a French army officer who served in the American Revolutionary War. He was promoted to brigadier general after the siege of Yorktown and led Chouan rebels during the Chouannerie. La Rouërie is less-remembered than Gilbert du Motier, Marquis de Lafayette and other Frenchmen in writings on France in the American Revolutionary War.

== Early life ==
Destined for a military career from his earliest years, La Rouërie had an impetuous temperament that soon brought him to the public eye. He spent a rebellious youth in and around the French royal court, serving as an officer in the Gardes Françaises. Infatuated with actress Mademoiselle Fleury, he was rejected when he asked for her hand in marriage. He later met the Count of Bourbon-Busset, in a duel. After wounding the count in the duel, he fell into disgrace with the king and was ejected from the Gardes. La Rouërie took poison and went to la Trappe to die. His friends met him there and prevented his suicide.

== American Revolution ==
In January 1777, La Rouërie embarked from France to join the Americans in their fight for independence. His ship, the Morris, was attacked by three British ships on its arrival in April. It sank in Chesapeake Bay, but La Rouërie succeeded in getting to shore with only three surviving servants.

Under George Washington's orders, he became Colonel Armand and recruited volunteers which he paid from his own pocket. Pulaski's Legion, initially named after its commander, was renamed the First Partisan Corps (or Armand's Partisan Corps or Armand's Legion) after Pulaski's death at the end of 1779. Made up of infantry and cavalry, this corps of foreign volunteers fluctuated between three and five companies strong.

Promoted to a General on 25 June 1778, La Rouërie took part in the battles of New York, Monmouth, Short Hills, Brandywine, Whitemarsh, the Campaign in Virginia, and the Siege of Yorktown. In 1781, Colonel Armand returned to France to re-equip his troops, and was there made a Knight of the Order of Saint-Louis. On 26 March 1783, he was made a brigadier general in the American Army, though he left the American Army on 25 November that year. He returned to France in the summer of 1784. He retained his friendship with Washington after leaving America and the two continued to correspond. La Rouërie was also made a member of the Society of the Cincinnati French chapter.

== Early French Revolution ==
In 1785 La Rouërie married Louise-Caroline Guérin, Marquise de Saint-Brice, a wealthy aristocrat. Shortly afterwards she developed mental illness and was treated by doctor Valentin Chevetel. Chevetel's help was not enough and La Rouërie’s wife died months later.

In the time leading to the French Revolution, La Rouërie declared himself a champion of the nobility and parliament of Brittany, which was struggling against the central court at Versailles. He was one of 12 deputies sent to the king in 1787 to petition for restoration of the province's privileges. In 1788 he gave up his military career when he rejected a command offered by Louis XVI, out of opposition to the king's suppression of liberties which the kingdom of France had accorded Brittany on their union, and was imprisoned as a result in the Bastille on 14 July that year. He was freed a month later but would give up his former ideals. At first, he welcomed the Revolution which soon followed, but at the Estates General of 1789 he was indignant at seeing the Breton nobility succumb to the demands of the Third Estate. Excited to resistance, he provoked a refusal to send representatives to the Estates General, saying that he did not want those of the ancient nobility to bend over themselves to become a double representation of the people. This helped lead to the creation of the Breton Association.

== Breton Association ==
La Rouërie traveled to Koblenz and received special powers granted by the Comte d'Artois and, somewhat later, by the Count of Provence. La Rouërie then began to organize the Breton Association. The Association raised troops and measures were taken to build support garrisons of the National Guard. La Rouërie was then scheduled to address the ranks of men.

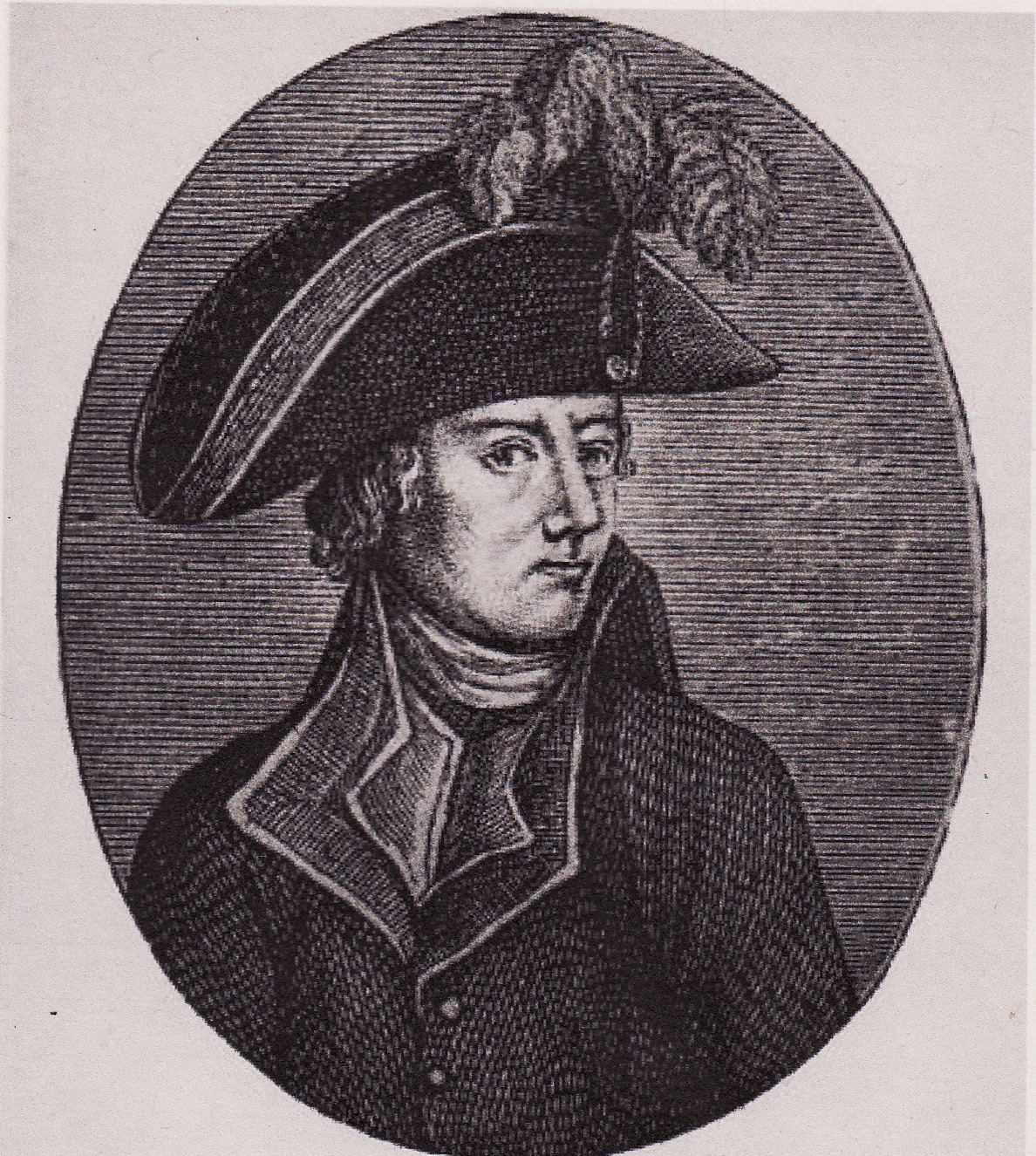
The Marquis de la Rouërie

La Rouërie found support among the population of Brittany, who were very disappointed with the results of the Revolution, after having first been in favor, and then strongly opposed to the Civil Constitution of the Clergy, which sought to destroy the independence of the Catholic Church in France from control by the State. La Rouërie, a non-practicing Catholic criticized the Civil Constitution of the Clergy, and prepared the manifesto of the Breton Association. He also argued that since the abolition of the Provincial Estates General of Brittany, poverty had increased, and taxes were now three times higher.

On 20 April 1792, the French declared war on the Austrian Monarchy and the Holy Roman Empire. That same day, opponents of the Revolutionaries received the support of the Kingdom of Prussia, and the Army of Émigrés, leading to the formation of the first coalition against Revolutionary France. The Breton Association was ready with 10,000 men equipped for battle.

After a raid by French Revolutionary Army dragoons upon the Marquis's castle, La Rouërie moved to Launay-Villiers, which was located close to the hideout of Jean Chouan and his men. There is no evidence that La Rouërie and Jean Chouan ever met face to face, or that he had been recruited by the Association, but La Rouërie remained in hiding for three months at Launay-Villiers until early September.

== Death ==
Throughout late 1792-early 1793, La Rouërie wandered the countryside of Brittany. He adopted the false name of Gasselin and was accompanied by only Loaisel Fricandeau, his secretary, and Saint-Pierre, one of his servants. On 12 January 1793, after traveling around the forest of La Hunaudaye, La Rouërie and his two companions sought refuge near Castle Guyomarch, which belonged to the family of the same name from the parish of Saint-Denoual. It had snowed that day, and Saint-Pierre was suffering from a fever. La Guyomarch, a member of the Association, had already hosted la Rouërie three times in the previous month. They were housed in the castle for a couple days but Saint-Pierre's state was not improving. The next day, Loaisel Morel fetched a surgeon at Plancoët. On January 18 Saint-Pierre recovered, but then La Rouërie in turn fell ill on January 19. Guyomar recalled Dr. Morel, then as a precautionary measure, sent for Dr. Taburet of Lamballe. La Rouërie was believed to be suffering from a fever and was suffering from chills and severe coughing but it is now known that La Rouërie had pneumonia.

On January 24, the National Guard of Lamballe made a raid on Castle Guyomarch. Alerted by a neighbor, La Guyomar hid the marquis in a farm, located a hundred meters from the castle. The Guard discovered nothing. The next day, Schaffner and Fontevieux came to Guyomarch, bringing with them a newspaper which told of the execution of Louis XVI on January 21. But the partners did not disclose the King's death to the Marquis, believing it would aggravate the Marquis and worsen the fever. In spite of the previous evening's episode, they maintained hope for his recovery. La Rouërie, however, asked to read the newspaper for news of the kings trial as he sensed his servant Saint Pierre. The Marquis requested Saint Pierre fetch him a drink. He read the newspaper which had been left behind in the room, and learned of the death of Louis XVI.

In a crisis of delirium, La Rouërie jumped out of bed, dressed, with the intent to leave the castle, but collapsed in a fit of weakness. For two to three days, he lay dying, alternating between prostration, delirium, and unconsciousness. A third doctor, Lemasson, was dispatched but could do nothing. La Rouërie died on 30 January 1793, at four-thirty in the morning.

== Bibliography ==
- Charles-Armand Tuffin, Marquis de la Rouërie, Chef de la conjuration bretonne. Généalogie, Notes, Documents et papiers inédits. Une Famille bretonne du XIIIe. J.Pilhon et L. Hervé, Libraires – Rennes – 1899. Par P.Delarue.
- Le Marquis de la Rouërie et la Conjuration bretonne. G. Lenôtre. Librairie Académique Perrin, 1927
- Le marquis de la Rouerie "Colonel Armand " de la guerre américaine à la conjuration bretonne Christian Bazin. Perrin.1990
- Le Colonel Armand Marquis de la Rouërie . Job de Roincé .Editions Fernand Lanore. 1974.
- Colonel Armand, Marquis de la Rouërie Hervé Le Bévillon. Editions Yoran Embanner.2006.
- François-René de Chateaubriand,Mémoires d'outre-tombe.
- Jean François de Chastellux,Voyages of M. le Marquis de Chastellux in North America in the years 1780, 1781 and 1782(1786) (reissue: Tallandier, Paris 1980)
- Theodore Lemas (1894). The District of Ferns during the Wars of the West and the Chouannerie 1793–1800. Rue des Scribes Editions.
- G. Lenotre,The Marquis de La Rouer, conspirator, 1895
- Toussaint du Breil de Pontbriand (1897). Memory Colonel Pontbriand. Plon edition, Paris.
- Paul Delarue,Charles Armand Tuffin, Marquis de la Rouer, leader of the conspiracy Breton. Genealogy, notes, documents and unpublished papers. A Family of Brittany. J. and L. Pilhon Hervé, Booksellers, Rennes, 1899
- G. Lenotre,an agent of Princes during the revolution: the Marquis de La cunning and conspiracy Breton (1790–1793), Perrin, Paris, 1899
- G. Lenotre (1927). The Marquis of Rouërie and Conjuration Breton. Perrin. Lenôtre.
- Job Roincé (1974). Colonel Armand Marquis of Rouërie. Fernand Lanore. Roincé.
- Christian Le Bouteiller (1989). The Revolution in the Pays de Fougères. Société archéologique et historique de l'arrondissement Fougères.
- Christian Bazin (1990). The Marquis of Rouërie "Colonel Armand" the American war in the conspiracy Breton. Perrin. Bazin.
- Jurame Ghislaine (1991). The Rouërie, the Revolution in Britain. Fernand Lanore. Jurame.
- Philippe Carr (2005). The UK and the American War of Independence. Les Portes du Large. Carrer.
