= Victor François de Montchenu =

French military officer (1764–1849)

Victor François de Montchenu (6 November 1764 in Bougé-Chambalud – 12 January 1849 in Paris) was a French soldier.

== Life ==
Victor François de Montchenu came from one of the oldest families in the Dauphiné, and one long devoted to military service. He was admitted to the Ecole des chevaux-légers as a child and in 1775 became sous-lieutenant of the régiment d'infanterie du Roi (King's Infantry Regiment), at a time when officer ranks were reserved for sons of the noble families. He was a captain in this corps during the Nancy affair, finding himself beside André Désilles when the latter died by throwing himself in front of a cannon in a vain hope of stopping the battle between the mutineers and the troops of de Bouillé.

Consistently monarchist, Montchenu quickly decided in 1792 that the royalist cause was irrevocably separated from the nation's cause and left France to join the armée des Princes, serving in it as aide-de-camp to général Livarot. In March 1793 he assisted in the defence of Maestricht against Charles François Dumouriez's force and served as an aide-major in the 1794-95 campaigns in the régiment de Broglie in the pay of England.

Returning to France on the peace of 1814, Montchenu was made a croix de Saint-Louis on 13 August that year and was made brevet maréchal de camp on 30 December. His elder brother was sent to Saint Helena in 1815 as commissioner of the French government to keep an eye on the behaviour of Napoleon. Under the Bourbon Restoration the younger Montchenu worked as inspector general of the infantry. He became a Knight (18 May 1820) then an Officer (1 May 1821) of the Légion d'honneur. His active career ceased after the July Revolution and he was allowed to retire in February 1835.

== Sources ==
- Mullié, Charles (1852). "MONTCHENU (VICTOR-FRANÇOIS, de)". Biographie des célébrités militaires des armées de terre et de mer de 1789 à 1850 (in French). Paris: Poignavant et Compagnie.
