= Charles Gaspard Élisabeth Joseph de Bailly =

Charles Gaspard Élisabeth Joseph de Bailly, marquis de Bailly (French pronunciation: [ʃaʁl ɡaspaʁ elizabɛt ʒozɛf də baji]; 6 January 1765, Le Bourgneuf-la-Forêt, Mayenne - 14 January 1850, Le Bourgneuf-la-Forêt) was a French army officer.

== Life ==
He was the son of Jean-Baptiste Joseph de Bailly (1732-1811), deputy to the estates general of 1789, and of Edmée or Aimée Anne Charlotte Lescalopier, the daughter of Gaspard César Charles Lescalopier, the intendant général of Tours.

He entered the army as sub-lieutenant in the King's Infantry Regiment (régiment d'infanterie du roi) in 1780 and on 28 August 1790 found himself caught up in the Nancy affair (he was one of the 16 officers to defend General Malseigne against the mutineers), in which he was wounded. He joined the émigré party and commanded the Salm-Kirburg hussar regiment in the Army of Condé and served alongside Charles François de Virot de Sombreuil, who promoted him to command the 2nd Division of the force sent to land at Quiberon.

He planned to marry Anne-Marie d'Allonville, daughter of Armand Jean d'Allonville, but this did not take place. In 1800, at Altona, he married Mademoiselle de Pardaillan, another émigré. They then went to Portugal together, where he became a field officer with the rank of brigadier. He stayed there until his father's death in 1811, which made him return to France.

He refused all Napoleon I's offers of a job in his army, he became the king's most devoted and trusted servant on the Bourbon Restoration, as president of the Conseil général de la Mayenne, maréchal de camp (from 18 April 1816) and inspector of the department's national guards (Gardes nationales), and as deputy in 1815 and 1824. In 1824 his name was put forward for the presidency.

A fervent royalist, he was elected to the Chambre introuvable by the college of the Mayenne department on 22 August 1815 - he was part of the majority party in it. Later, re-elected in the 6 March 1824 legislative elections, he continued to support the government - even so, he supported the proposal of Jan Kowitz.

On 5 November 1827 he was on the list of 76 new peers intended "to break the national majority in the upper chamber".

His unselfishness always put him at a distance from the court and even made him refuse the 19,000 franc pension he was entitled to as a peer of France. Not even the king could get Bailly's inflexible conscience to bend to policy and ended by telling him "My friend, you are right".

His public career ended in 1830, but he stayed active for 20 years more in his services to agriculture and philanthropy. He became a commander of the order of Saint Louis on 23 May 1825 and died at the château de Fresnay in Mayenne on 14 January 1850. All parties paid tribute to his character and convictions.

== Sources ==
- "Charles Gaspard Élisabeth Joseph de Bailly", in Adolphe Robert and Gaston Cougny, Dictionnaire des parlementaires français (1789–1891), Bourloton, Paris, 1889 Edition details Wikisource
