= Launay-Villiers =

- Commune
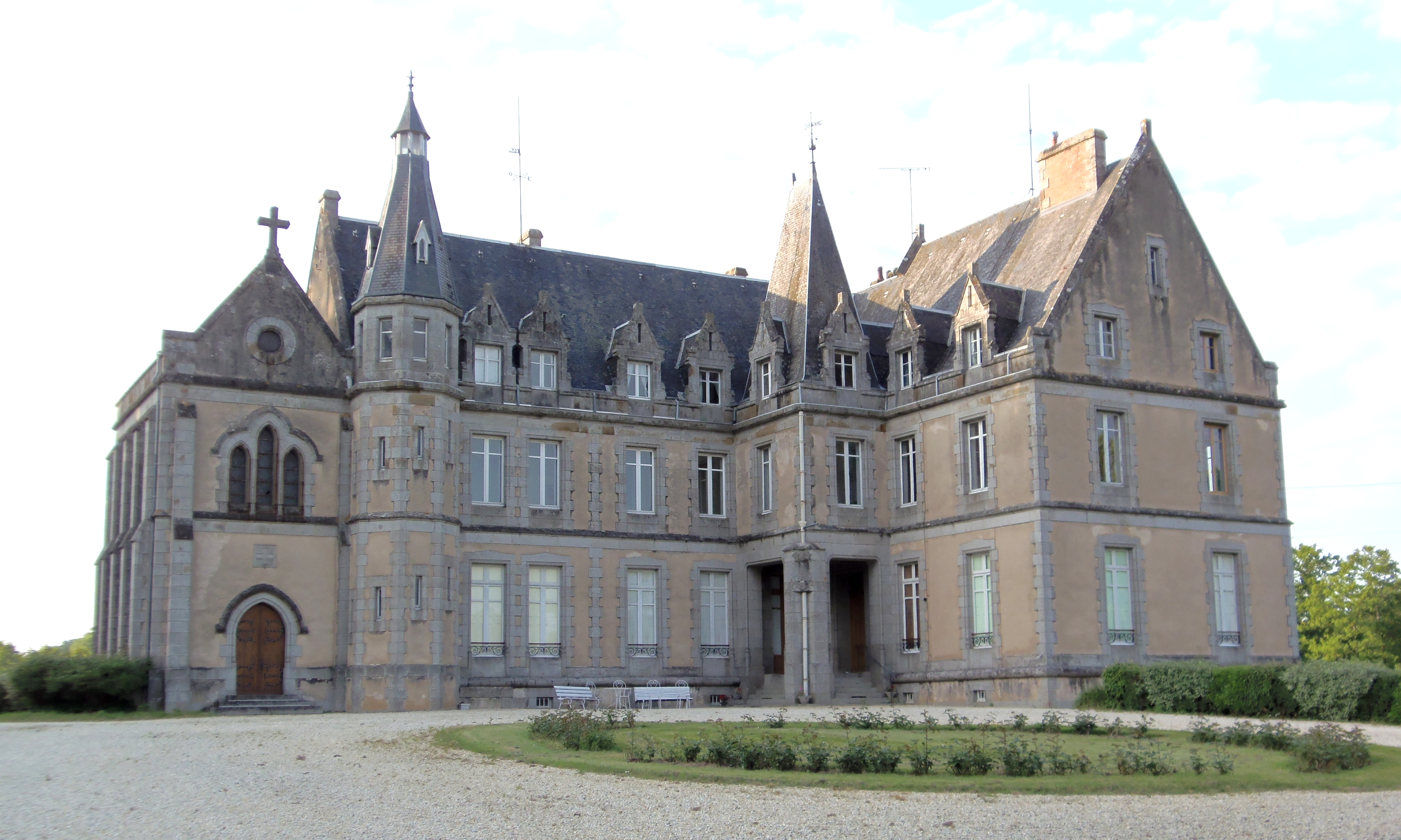
- The Château of Villiers, in Launay-Villiers
- Location of Launay-Villiers
- Location within France Location within Pays de la Loire
- Coordinates: 48°08′05″N 1°00′27″W
- Country: France
- Region: Pays de la Loire
- Department: Mayenne
- Arrondissement: Laval
- Canton: Loiron-Ruillé
- Intercommunality: Laval Agglomération

Government
  - Mayor (2020–2026): Hervé Lhotellier
- Area^{1}: 9.05 km^{2} (3.49 sq mi)
- Elevation: 140 m (460 ft)
- Highest elevation: 172 m (564 ft)
- Lowest elevation: 107 m (351 ft)
- Population (2023): 350
  - Density: 39/km^{2} (100/sq mi)
- Time zone: UTC+01:00 (CET)
  - Summer (DST): UTC+02:00 (CEST)
- INSEE/Postal code: 53129 /53410
- ^{1} French Land Register data, which excludes lakes, ponds, glaciers > 1 km^{2} (0.386 sq mi or 247 acres) and river estuaries.

Launay-Villiers (French pronunciation: [lonɛ vilje]) is a commune in the Mayenne department in north-western France.

== Geography ==
Launay-Villiers is located about 25 kilometres (16 mi) west-northwest of Laval. The Vicoin forms the western boundary of the commune. Launay-Villiers is bordered by the communes of Bourgon to the north and west, Le Bourgneuf-la-Forêt to the north and east, Port-Brillet to the southeast, and Saint-Pierre-la-Cour to the south.

== Population ==
Year	Pop.
1962	299
1968	319
1975	330
1982	358
1990	343
1999	350
2006	396
2019	383

== See also ==
- Communes of the Mayenne department
