= André Désilles =

French Army officer (1767–1790)

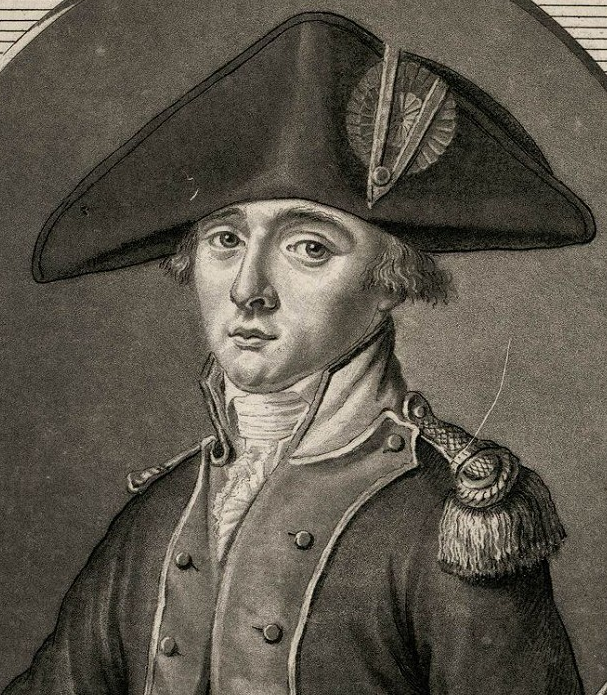
- Born: March 11, 1767; Saint-Malo, France
- Died: October 17, 1790 (aged 23); Nancy, France
- Military career
- Allegiance: Kingdom of France
- Branch: French Army
- Rank: Lieutenant
- Unit: Régiment du Roi

André (or Antoine-Joseph-Marc) Désilles (11 March 1767, Saint-Malo – 17 October 1790, Nancy) was a junior French army officer during the early stages of the French Revolution. In 1790 he was a lieutenant in the Régiment du Roi infanterie which together with the Mestre-de-Camp Cavalry and the Swiss Régiment de Lullin de Chateauvieux comprised the regular garrison of Nancy in north-eastern France. All three regiments mutinied against their officers in August of that year in what came to be known as the Nancy affair. On 31 August 1790, Désilles was mortally wounded whilst throwing himself in front of a cannon in a vain hope of stopping the outbreak of fighting between the mutineers and troops sent to restore order under General de Bouillé. Nancy's Porte Désilles is named after him.

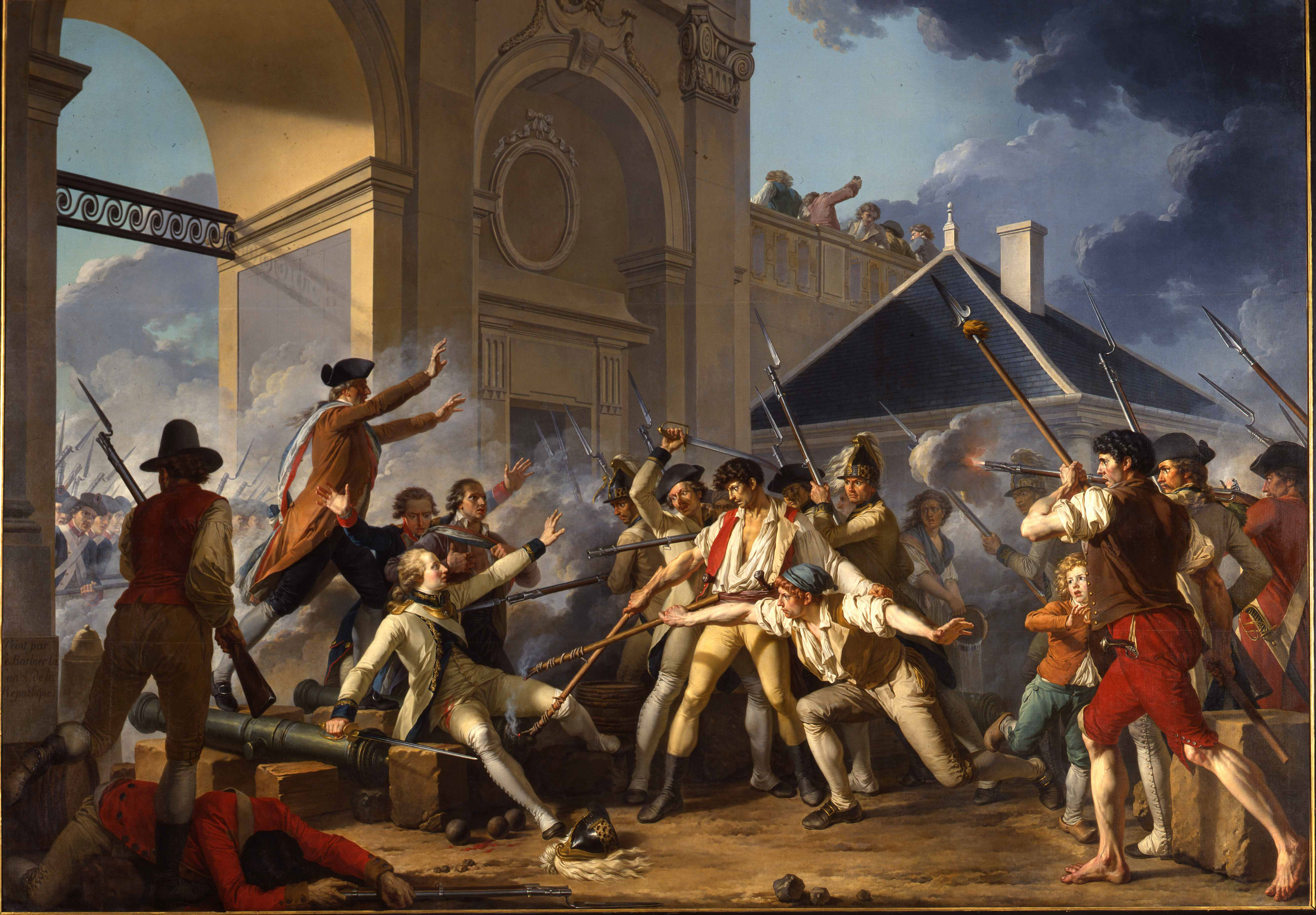
Le Courage héroïque du jeune Désilles, le 31 août 1790, à l'affaire de Nancy, Le Barbier, 1794 (Musée de la Révolution française.
