= Louis de Bouillé =

French general

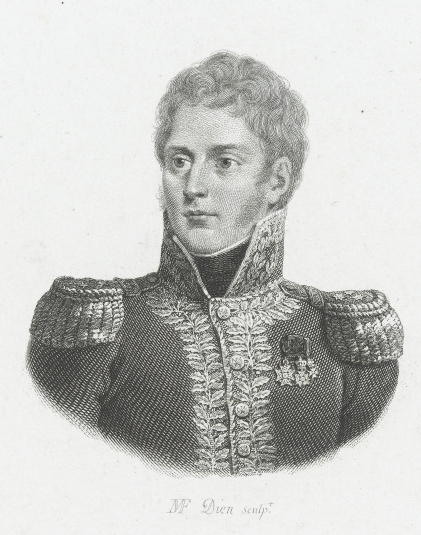
Portrait of Louis de Bouillé

Louis de Bouillé, marquis de Bouillé (Martinique, 1 May 1769 – 20 November 1850) was a French general. He was the son of François Claude Amour, marquis de Bouillé, and brother of the two Bouillés who participated in Louis XVI's attempted Flight to Varennes.
