= Jean Chouan =

French counter-revolutionary (1757–1794)

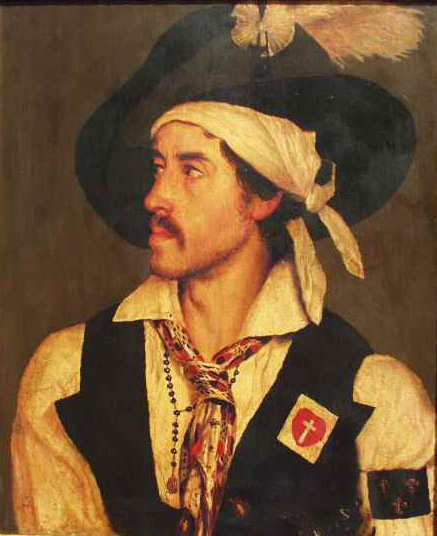
Jean Chouan

Jean Cottereau (French pronunciation: [ʒɑ̃ kɔtʁo]), better known by his nom de guerre Jean Chouan (French pronunciation: [ʒɑ̃ ʃwɑ̃]; Saint-Berthevin, 30 October 1757 – Olivet, 18 July 1794), was a French royalist and counter-revolutionary during the Chouannerie.

Jean was the second-born of four brothers (Pierre, Jean, François, and René). His nickname came from his father who fondly called him chouan ("the silent one"). Others say his nickname came from an imitation of the call of the tawny owl (the chouette hulotte) he customarily used as a recognition signal. Less flatteringly, Jean's young comrades nicknamed him "the boy liar" (le Gars mentoux or le garçon menteur).

The 1926 Luitz-Morat film Jean Chouan starred Maurice Lagrenée as Chouan.

== Reliability of sources ==
Much of the biographical material on Jean Chouan is based on the work of Jacques Duchemin des Cépeaux, in a work written in 1825 at the request of the king, Charles X, who ruled France from 1824 until 1830. Cépeaux was considered to be a royalist partisan, and the claims that he presents may be unfounded or influenced by his perceived bias. Therefore, the story of Jean Chouan likely could consist more of legends of the revolution than facts. The persistence of the legend can be explained by the fact it has been continuously nourished by a small faction of Catholics and royalist-legitimists who have remained active up to the present day.

Chouan's presence in history is mostly barren and archives, even those belonging to aristocrats living in the region, indicate that he was completely unknown prior to the Bourbon restoration in 1814. One thing is certain: the republicans, in their effort to quell the insurgency, contributed to the birth of the legend. The name, Jean Chouan, may, in fact, have been invented by republican authorities who were unable to name the true leaders of the insurrection against their own 1789 revolution, the revolution that had unseated the royal house of Bourbon in the first place.

== Origins ==
Pierre Cottereau, a lumberjack and maker of wooden shoes (sabots), lived with his wife, Jeanne Cottereau (born Jeanne Moyné), as a tenant at la Closerie des Poiriers (literally, the "pear orchard enclosure"), a farm halfway between the villages of Saint-Ouën-des-Toits and Bourgneuf-la-Forêt in Mayenne, France. (An 'enclosure' is, in fact, a small farm, usually less than twenty acres in extent, and the name comes from the need for farmers to enclose their properties with fences or hedges to prevent cattle, sheep, and other domesticated animals from running free.) Tenancy on this piece of property had been established by the Moyné family about 1750.

The elder Cottereau, like his father before him, made his family's living by criss-crossing the wooded regions of western France, from the forest between Mondevert and Le Pertre to the forest of Concise, felling trees, stacking and seasoning the timber, and making wooden shoes, which he sold in the villages of Mayenne.

From the local parish registers, particularly those of the parish of Olivet, where the Closerie des Poiriers was located, it is clear that this was a region deep in economic misery throughout the second half of the eighteenth century. For example, in several birth records, there is the notation, "né sur la lande" (born on the land), indicating that the child's parents were likely to have been casual workers sleeping rough. So great was the misery of the forge workers at Port-Brillet, owned by the prince of Talmont-Saint-Hilaire, Antoine Philippe de La Trémoille, that they took part in the French Revolution, joined the National Guard and became ardent Republican patriots. Workers in La Brûlatte behaved similarly.

The Cottereau family came from a line of merchants, notaries, and priests, and, unlike most of his neighbors, Pierre was literate and respectable. His children, however, were violent, quarrelsome, lazy, and resolutely ignorant.

Without doubt, their father's prolonged absences, cutting timber in distant forests, carving shoes, selling his sabots over a wide swath of Mayenne, deprived the Cottereau children of an authority figure. Further, since their mother was illiterate, as was common at that time, the Cottereau children were also largely unschooled. Their father died in 1778 when Jean Chouan was twenty-one years old. Pierre the younger, Jean's only elder brother, proclaimed himself a sabotier like his father, but he was neither so skillful nor so industrious as his father had been. To survive, all six Cottereaus, four brothers and two sisters, became involved in salt-smuggling.

Before 1790, the gabelle was a very unpopular tax on salt. Traditionally, France has been composed of a collection of regions, former duchies, principalities, or independent kingdoms, most of which enjoyed long periods of sovereignty, periods when they were all-but-completely divorced, politically, from the rest of France. Well-known examples of the regions are Normandy, Burgundy, Brittany, and Aquitaine. As an accident of the historical development of an integrated France, these regions had different tax rates for commodities like salt.

Whenever there is a disparity in prices or taxes between two neighboring jurisdictions, there will be smuggling. For example, La Croixille is a town in the department of Mayenne, which was (and is) a part of the region of Maine, in the eighteenth century, a high-salt-tax region. Across the River Vilaine, the neighboring town of Princé, was, with respect to salt, in a tax-exempt region, Brittany. The huge disparity between the price of salt in the two towns prompted active smuggling, with salt purchased cheaply in Brittany being moved across the river and sold for a high price in Mayenne. A perpetual guerrilla war between customs officers and salt-smugglers simmered in the valley of the Vilaine.

Those who engaged in this tax-avoidance traffic were known as "false-salters". The term, "false-salter", referred to criminal attempts to falsely represent lightly taxed salt as salt that had already been heavily taxed. An unarmed person caught "false-salting" was subject to condemnation to the galleys and deportation; by law, an armed false-salter could be executed. Between 1730 and 1743, 585 salt-smugglers were deported to New France (Quebec).

Jean Chouan and his brothers, François and René, were actively involved in this kind of commerce, and, although they knew the territory intimately, including all of the places in the forests of the borderlands where illicit salt might be hidden, they were stopped on several smuggling trips and narrowly avoided arrest.

Aside from their smuggling activities, the Cottereaus conducted a number of shady enterprises in the Misedon woods that surrounded their house at the Closerie des Poiriers. Sometime before 1780, Jean Cottereau, in the company of his brother, René, and a few others, were in the forest drinking moonshine alcohol, in breach of the laws of Olivet, when they were surprised by two local constables, Pierre Bériteau and Jean Guitton. A brawl ensued. When it was over, a surgeon from Laval declared that one of the two was so badly injured that he could not stand to be transported to hospital. Instead, he was transported to an inn at Saint-Ouën-des-Toits, where he remained for several weeks. The Cottereaus, called before the bar of justice, were ordered to pay for the injured man's medical treatment, and for his room and board during the period of his confinement.

This episode was just one of a large number of transgressions engaged in by Jean and his brothers. The thuggish Cottereaus, over a period of several years managed to injure or cripple almost all their neighbors, usually for nonsensical reasons, and, inevitably, one or more of them was brought to court and forced to pay compensation to their victims in order to avoid imprisonment or deportation. This ruined the family financially.

== Before the French Revolution ==
In 1780, when he was twenty-three years old, Jean Chouan was a wanted man. He was being hunted down for having beaten a man named Marchais, who, he suspected, had informed the authorities about his salt-smuggling activities. He was also wanted for a more serious crime: with his friend, Jean Croissant, Chouan was alleged to have killed a customs agent, Olivier Jagu, with repeated blows of a billy-club, in a Saint-Germain-le-Fouilloux inn.

Sentenced to death in absentia, his execution took place in effigy, along with that of his accomplice, Jean Croissant. He had gone into hiding by fleeing the area where he was well-known and enlisting, under a false name, in the 37th Infantry Regiment in Turenne in central France. Other sources indicate that his mother, suspecting that he had been abducted by the crown and summarily imprisoned (or executed), went to Versailles to ask for his pardon from the king. This is doubtful. In fact, the possibility that Chouan was already in custody is contradicted by the fact that the proceedings initiated against him in 1780 were resumed in 1785. From family recollections and papers gathered by Jacques Duchemin Cépeaux, he concluded that Jean Chouan spent his time of absence in a distant garrison of the king's army.

Jean Chouan was arrested on 18 May 1785 in Bourgneuf-la-Forêt. Under interrogation, he denied any participation in the murder of the customs agent, but he was sentenced to a year in prison anyway. He was more fortunate than his friend, Jean Croissant, who had been apprehended, tried, and convicted earlier. Chouan was not confronted by key witnesses; some were dead, others had recanted, and others were excused from testifying. Therefore, the prosecutor, Enjubault-Laroche, was unable to cobble together a strong case, and when it was heard on 9 September 1785, the result was a disappointing sentence, a single year in prison.

Freed on 9 September 1786, Chouan was immediately rendered to the Dépôt de Mendicité in Rennes, under a decree postmarked 2 August 1786, and he stayed there three years. Upon his release, he took work as a servant in the household of Marie Le Bourdais, the widow of Alexis Ollivier, a cousin, then living in Chouan's home parish of Olivet. The widow's son was a priest, Alexis Ollivier, so Chouan took on an air of semi-respectability that helped to deflect any new suspicions about his criminal character.

== Discontent ==
The French Revolution broke out in 1789, and it soon became apparent that the victorious republicans intended not only to overturn the monarchy but to redefine relations between the State and the Roman Catholic Church as well. Laws were passed by the new National Constituent Assembly (Assemblée constituante) to reform the Church and, little by little, to erode its traditional powers and prerogatives. For example, on 11 August 1789, tithes were abolished. On 2 November 1789, Catholic Church property, chiefly farmland and other real estate, held for the purpose of generating church revenue, was nationalized. On 13 February 1790, monastic vows were forbidden, and all ecclesiastical orders and congregations were dissolved, excepting those devoted to teaching children and nursing the sick. On 19 April 1790, the administration of all remaining church property was transferred to the State.

The final stroke was the Civil Constitution of the Clergy (Constitution civile du clergé), passed on 12 July 1790, which entirely subordinated the Roman Catholic Church in France to the French government. Going forward, bishops (known as constitutional bishops) and priests were to be elected locally, and those casting ballots, the 'electors', were required to sign an oath affirming their loyalty to the constitution. There was no requirement that the electors be Catholic, so this created the ironic situation that Protestants and Jews could elect nominally Catholic priests and bishops. Under the Civil Constitution, new bishops were required to swear their loyalty to the State in far stronger terms than they ever had under any prevailing religious doctrine.

From the beginning of 1791, landowning priests were forced from their parishes, and they were replaced by elected priests, without property, who had sworn an oath to the Civil Constitution. More importantly, the possessions of the clergy, and other property which had been owned by the Church for centuries, were put up for sale in order to refill the coffers of the royal treasury, which, as had become painfully obvious during the crisis of the Estates-General, were virtually empty.

Naturally, reactions to these new laws were strong and varied. A substantial number of French citizens heartily approved, and even the reformist faction within the Church could not find fault with some of the measures, especially those that denied the Church the right to continue to operate like a business, rather than as a spiritual institution. Others were adamantly, even violently, opposed. Predictably, those who abhorred the ecclesiastical reforms were also those who, most doggedly, supported the monarchy. Reactions also varied geographically. An interesting indicator of local sentiment was the percentage of priests who were willing to swear allegiance to the new Constitution. In dioceses near Paris and in the southeast, more than nine of ten priests were willing to take the oath. On the other hand, the percentage of swearing priests was lowest in Brittany, in some small pockets in the northeast, and in Nîmes and Toulouse in the south, all between one-third and one-half.

Jean Chouan, given his situation as a displaced employee of the abbé, Alexis Ollivier, could not remain passive.
