= Porte Désilles =

Monument in Nancy (France)

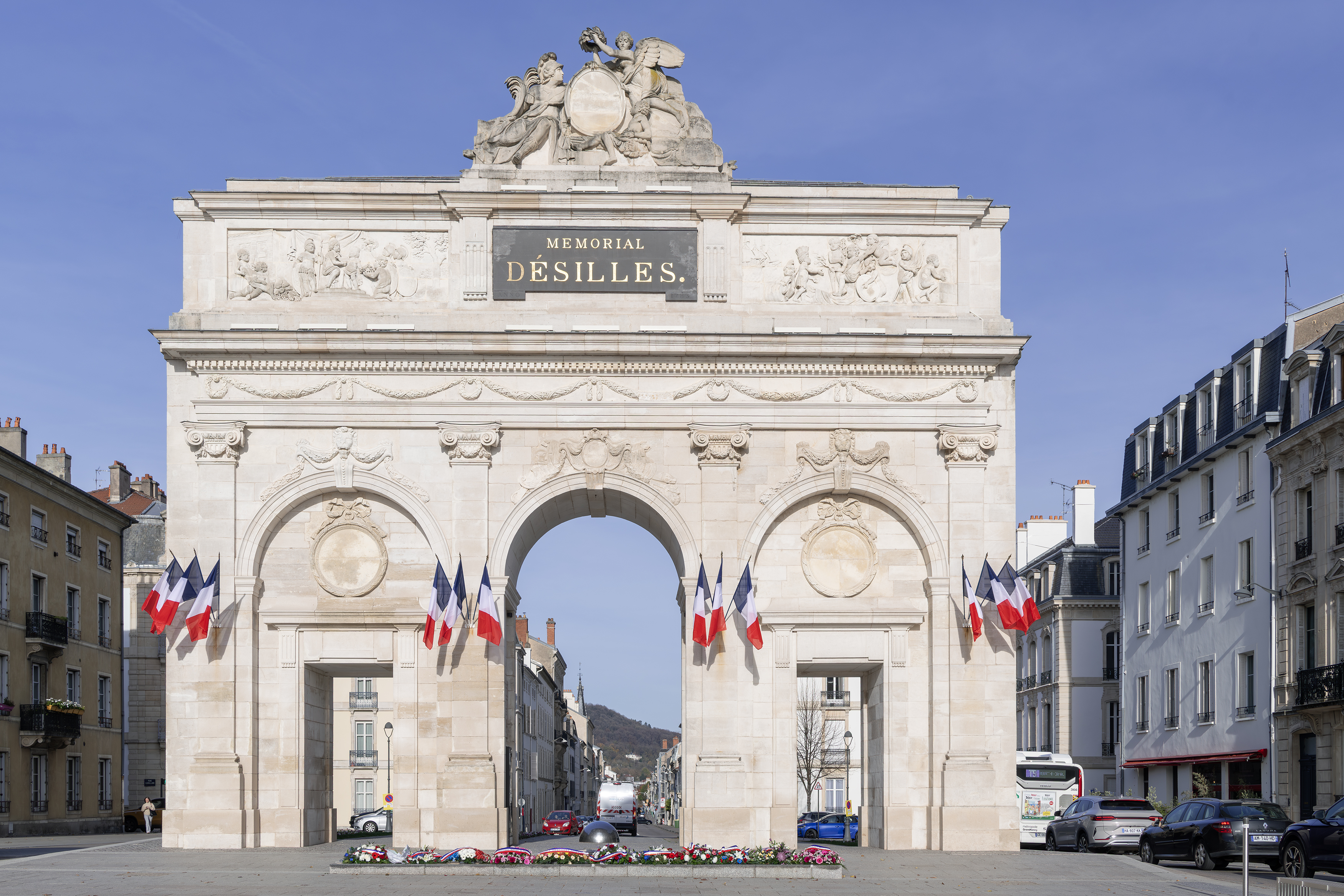
- Porte Désilles
- Interactive map of the Porte Désilles area

General information
- Type: Memorial gate
- Architectural style: Neoclassicism
- Location: Nancy, France
- Coordinates: 48°41′53″N 6°10′27″E
- Construction started: 1782
- Completed: 1784

Design and construction
- Architect: Didier-Joseph-François Mélin

The Porte Désilles or Mémorial Désilles is a memorial gate in Nancy, France. It is considered to be the oldest war memorial in France.

It is located on the Place du Luxembourg, on the northern extension of the Cours Léopold and the Esplanade du Souvenir-Français, at the junction of the Rue Désilles, the Rue de Metz and the Rue de la Craffe. It was built between 1782 and 1784 to designs by the architect Didier-Joseph-François Mélin on the initiative of the Comte de Stainville, commander in chief of Lorraine.

This monument was intended to close the view at the end of the Cours Léopold and to open a view out onto the Route de Metz, as well as to provide a memorial to citizens of Nancy who had died in the American Revolutionary War, specifically during the Siege of Yorktown (1781).

Its name was initially the Porte Saint-Louis, then the Porte Stainville, and finally took its present name in memory of André Désilles and his death in the Nancy affair. It was made a monument historique on 15 January 1925.
