= Nancy affair =

Crushing of a military mutiny in France on 31 August 1790

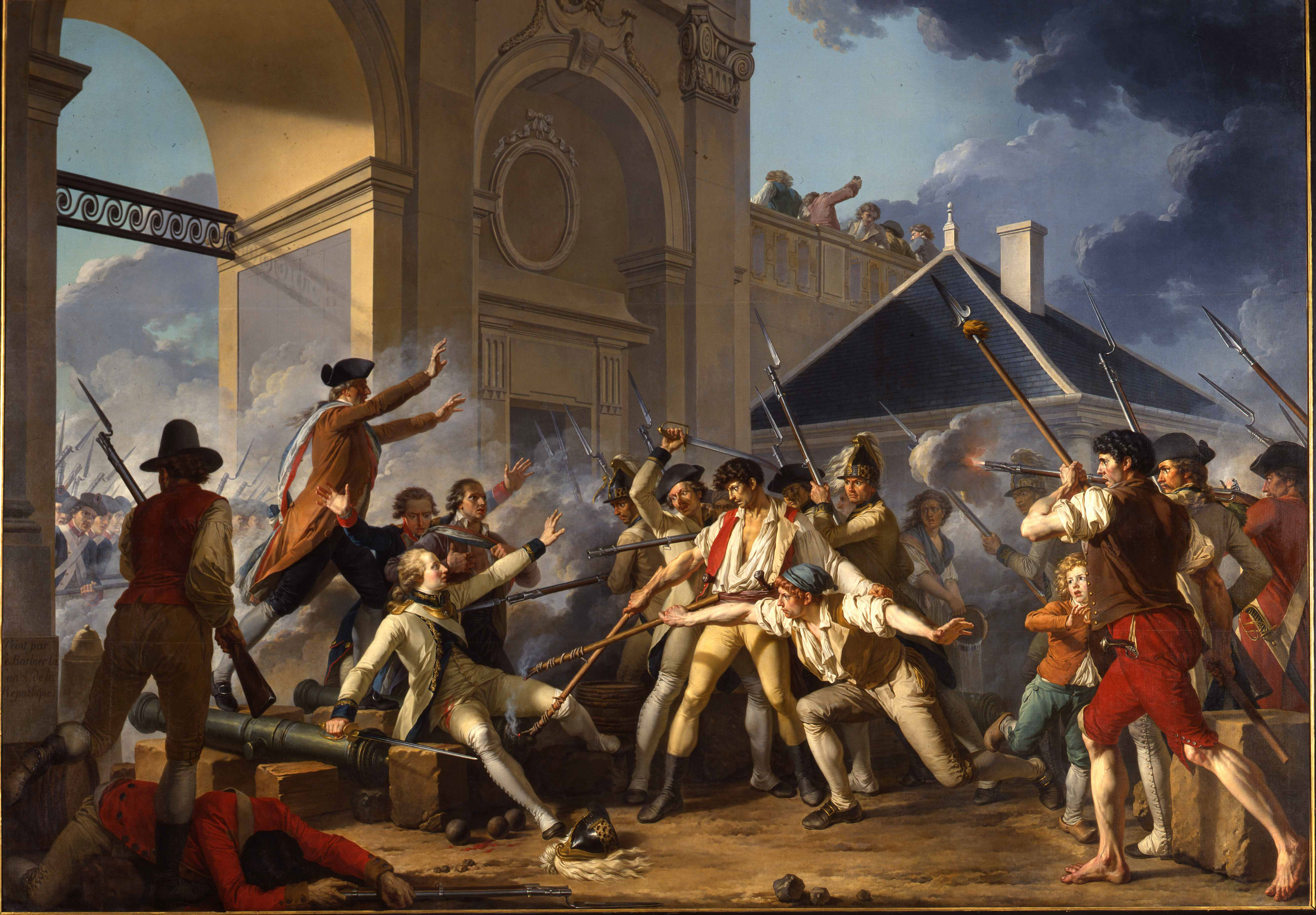
Le Courage héroïque du jeune Désilles, le 31 août 1790, à l'affaire de Nancy, Le Barbier, 1794 (Musée de la Révolution française.

The Nancy affair (French: Affaire de Nancy), commonly referred to in English as the Nancy Mutiny, was the crushing of a military mutiny in France on 31 August 1790, two years before the final overthrow of the French monarchy. The mutiny was of particular significance in that it illustrated the degree to which the discipline and reliability of the Royal Army had been undermined by thirteen months of revolutionary turmoil.

== Background ==
The Nancy Mutiny occurred at a time when unrest was spreading amongst the regular regiments of the French Army, following the Storming of the Bastille, the mutiny of the gardes-francaises (French Guards) and the forced relocation of the royal family from Versailles to Paris in 1789. While the officers of the army were still predominantly royalist, the rank and file were becoming increasingly influenced by the revolutionary turmoil around them. During the first half of 1790 a number of acts of disobedience and small scale mutinies occurred in various units, and political associations were created with links to the Jacobins and other parties outside the army. Specific military grievances were widespread amongst the soldiers, relating mainly to harsh discipline and conditions of service. Particularly resented was a measure taken in 1781 to reserve officer commissions to members of the nobility. This restriction had alienated many non-commissioned officers who now had no chance of promotion beyond their existing rank.

== Mutiny in Nancy ==
In August 1790, the city garrison of Nancy consisted of three French Royal Army regiments. These were the King's Regiment, Châteauvieux Regiment and Camp-Master General's Dragoon Regiment. The soldiers' committee of the King's Regiment demanded the right to audit the regiment's accounts, arrested its quartermaster, confined the colonel and other officers of the unit to the barracks and seized the regimental pay chest. The Châteauvieux Regiment followed suit in a particularly disturbing development from the perspective of the royal court since the Swiss regiments of the French army were assumed to be the most reliable element within it. The Châteauvieux Regiment's officers were able to temporarily restore order and punish members of the regiment's soldiers' committee in accordance with the Swiss military code by running the gauntlet. This led to renewed disturbances now involving all three regiments of the garrison.

== Suppression ==
Fearing that the outbreak in Nancy would spread to the other garrisons located along the frontier, the National Constituent Assembly in Paris ordered suppression of the mutiny. The Assembly concerned at the increasing indiscipline had already voted to abolish political associations within the army. General François Claude de Bouillé, army commander at Metz, accordingly led 4,500 regular soldiers and national guardsmen to Nancy on 18 August. De Bouillé, a committed royalist, was later to be a leading force in Louis XVI's attempted flight to Varennes.

Upon arrival at the city on 31 August, de Bouillé issued an ultimatum to a delegation from the mutinous soldiers demanding the release of their officers and the handing over of four ring-leaders. These terms appeared acceptable to the majority of the soldiers, but before they could be implemented, a clash occurred at the Stainville Gate, where the advance ranks of de Bouillé's forces were halted before an artillery piece manned by soldiers of the Régiment du Roi. Antoine-Joseph-Marc Désilles, a junior officer of the Régiment du Roi, stepped in front of a 24-pounder cannon loaded with canister in an attempt to dissuade the mutineers from firing on the government troops. He was shot down, and in the confusion the cannon was fired, killing about 60 of the loyal troops drawn up in close formation a few paces away. A general engagement then broke out, and after three hours of fighting, de Bouillé's troops put down the mutiny with heavy casualties amongst soldiers and civilians. Total deaths were estimated at 500.

== Aftermath ==
While the French regiments involved escaped serious repercussions, the Swiss mutineers faced severe punishment after court-martial by their own officers. One identified as the prime ringleader was broken on the wheel, 22 were hanged, 41 were sentenced to 30 years as galley slaves (in effect hard labour for life since galleys were no longer in service) and a further 74 were imprisoned. The National Constituent Assembly approved of de Bouillé's actions, but radicals protested its severity. The effect on popular opinion of these draconian measures was to create widespread sympathy for the mutineers, who were subsequently released in the midst of a large-scale celebration, and to further weaken the discipline and morale of the regular army. Disturbances in the Royal Army continued until the final overthrow of the monarchy in August 1792.

== See also ==
- Claude Juste Alexandre Legrand
- Charles Gaspard Elisabeth Joseph de Bailly
- Victor François de Montchenu

== Sources ==
- A Concise History of the French Revolution
- "French Revolutionary Infantry 1789-1802", Terry Crowdy, ISBN 1 84176 660 7.
- Citizens, Simon Schama, ISBN 0-670-81012-6
