= Armand's Legion =

- Active: 1778–1783
- Allegiance: United States
- Type: Dragoon
- Size: 300–450
- Part of: Continental Army
- Engagements: Guilford Court House and Yorktown

Commanders
- Notable commanders: Colonel Armand

Armand's Legion was formed on June 25, 1778, at Boston, Massachusetts under the command of Colonel Charles Armand Tuffin of France, for service with the Continental Army.

== From French Army to American ==
Armand had previously served in the French Army, serving with the Garde de Corps or household guard to the King of France; however, he was forced to leave after injuring the King's cousin in a duel, heading on to America. George Washington had given permission to Armand to raise a legion in 1776, but Armand did not fare so well and the Frenchman is reputed to have purchased the legion of a Swiss major.

== Swelling numbers ==
The legion was recruited primarily from foreign volunteers to the American Revolution. After hard fighting with Washington in the north Armand's Legion had taken heavy losses, however, permission was given for its numbers to be renewed from Hessen POWs. In 1780 the remnants of Pulaski's Legion were added to Armand's Legion.

== 1st Partisan Corps ==
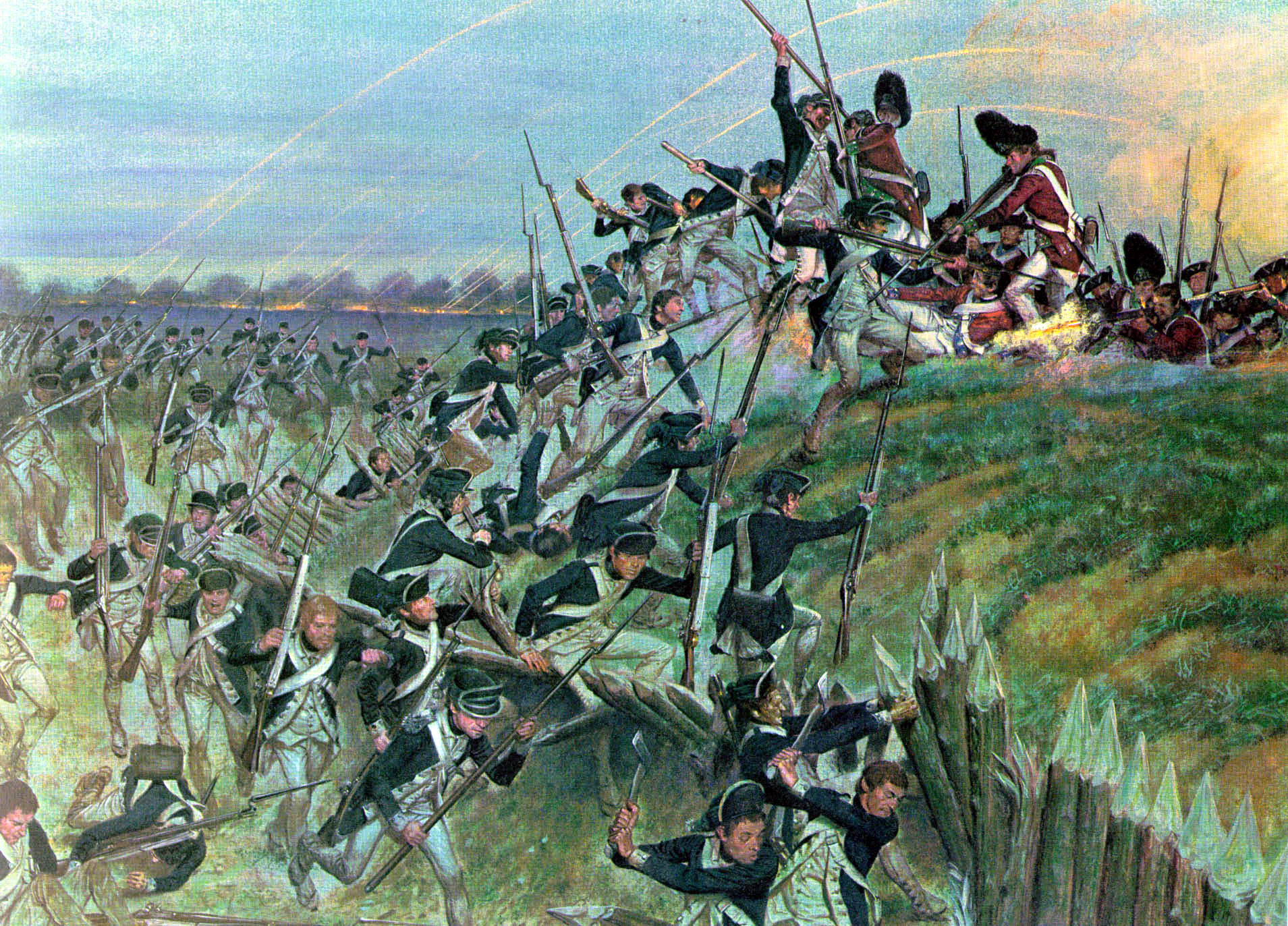
The taking of Redoubt 10

In 1781 the legion was consolidated with Capt. Henry Bedkin's Troop of Light Horse, and was reorganized and renamed the 1st Partisan Corps. The legion would see action at the Battle of Camden, Battle of Guilford Court House and the Siege of Yorktown. Armand had left the legion just after the Battle of Camden for France to gain fresh funds and supplies, returning to meet his legion at Yorktown's front lines, participating with them on the successful assault of Redoubt 10.

== Disbanding ==
The legion was disbanded at York, Pennsylvania, on December 25, 1783.
