= Flight to Varennes =

Attempted escape by the French royal family during the French Revolution

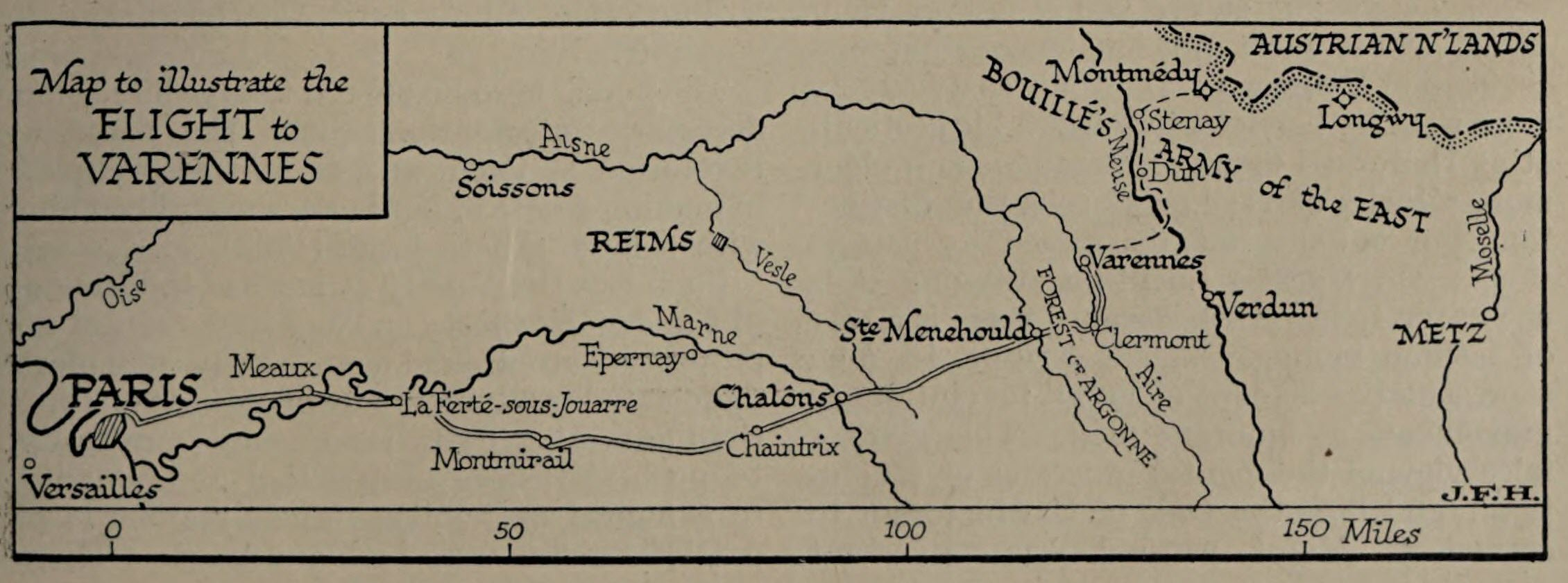
The route from the Tuileries Palace to Varennes-en-Argonne (approximate distance 250 km)

The Flight to Varennes (French: Fuite de Varennes) during the night of 20–21 June 1791 was a significant event in the French Revolution in which the French royal family—comprising Louis XVI, Marie Antoinette, the Dauphin Louis Charles, Marie-Thérèse, Madame Royale, and Madame Élisabeth—unsuccessfully attempted to leave Paris for Montmédy, along with loyal members of their retinue. The King hoped to regain his freedom there, with the protection of royalist troops, as the Revolution was intensifying and the threat to the royal family's safety grew. They reached the small town of Varennes-en-Argonne, where they were stopped and arrested after being recognised at their earlier stop in Sainte-Menehould.

This incident was a turning point after which Parisian hostility towards the monarchy, as well as towards the King and Queen as individuals, became much more pronounced. The King's attempted flight provoked charges of treason that ultimately led to his execution in 1793. The flight failed due to a series of misadventures, delays, misinterpretations, and poor judgements. The King's decisions and indecision on a number of matters, including the means and timing of the journey, allowed seemingly small matters to escalate.

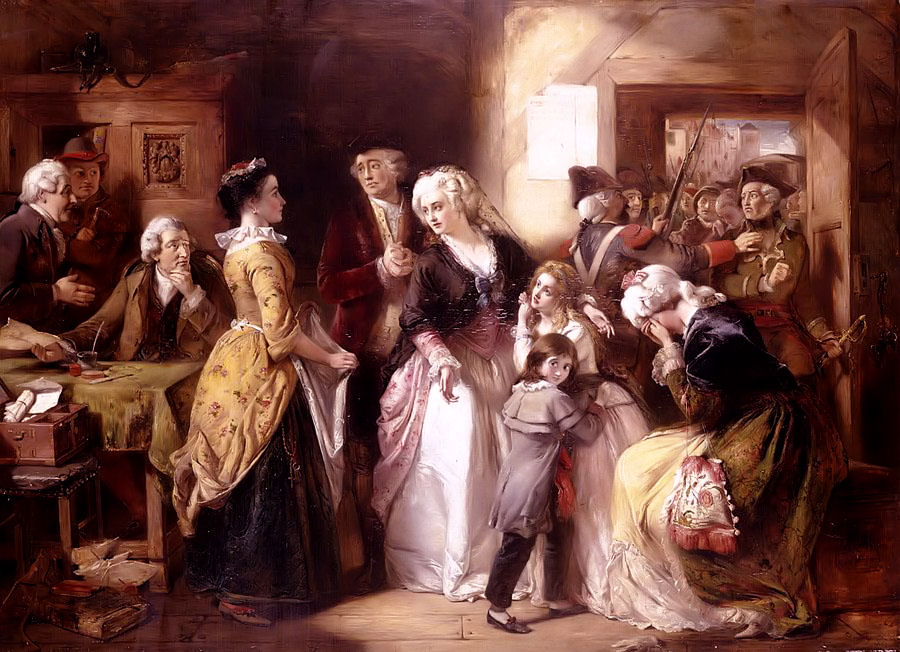
Louis XVI and his family, dressed as bourgeois, arrested in Varennes. Painting by Thomas Falcon Marshall (1854)

The King's flight was traumatic for Paris, inciting reactions. The realisation that the King had effectually repudiated the Revolutionary reforms made up to that point came as a shock to people who had seen him as genuinely supporting the Revolution. Republicanism quickly evolved from being merely a subject of coffee-house debate to the dominant ideal of Revolutionary leaders.

The King's brother, the comte de Provence, also fled on the same night, by a different route. He successfully escaped, and spent the French Revolution in exile, later returning as King Louis XVIII.

== Background ==
After the march on Versailles in October 1789, the royal family was forcibly transferred from the Palace of Versailles to the Tuileries Palace, where they were placed under virtual house arrest. Until then, Louis XVI had accepted many actions which disrespected his authority, but when the royal family was prevented from leaving the Tuileries to spend Easter at the Château de Saint-Cloud in 1791, his lack of freedom became obvious.

== Objectives of flight ==
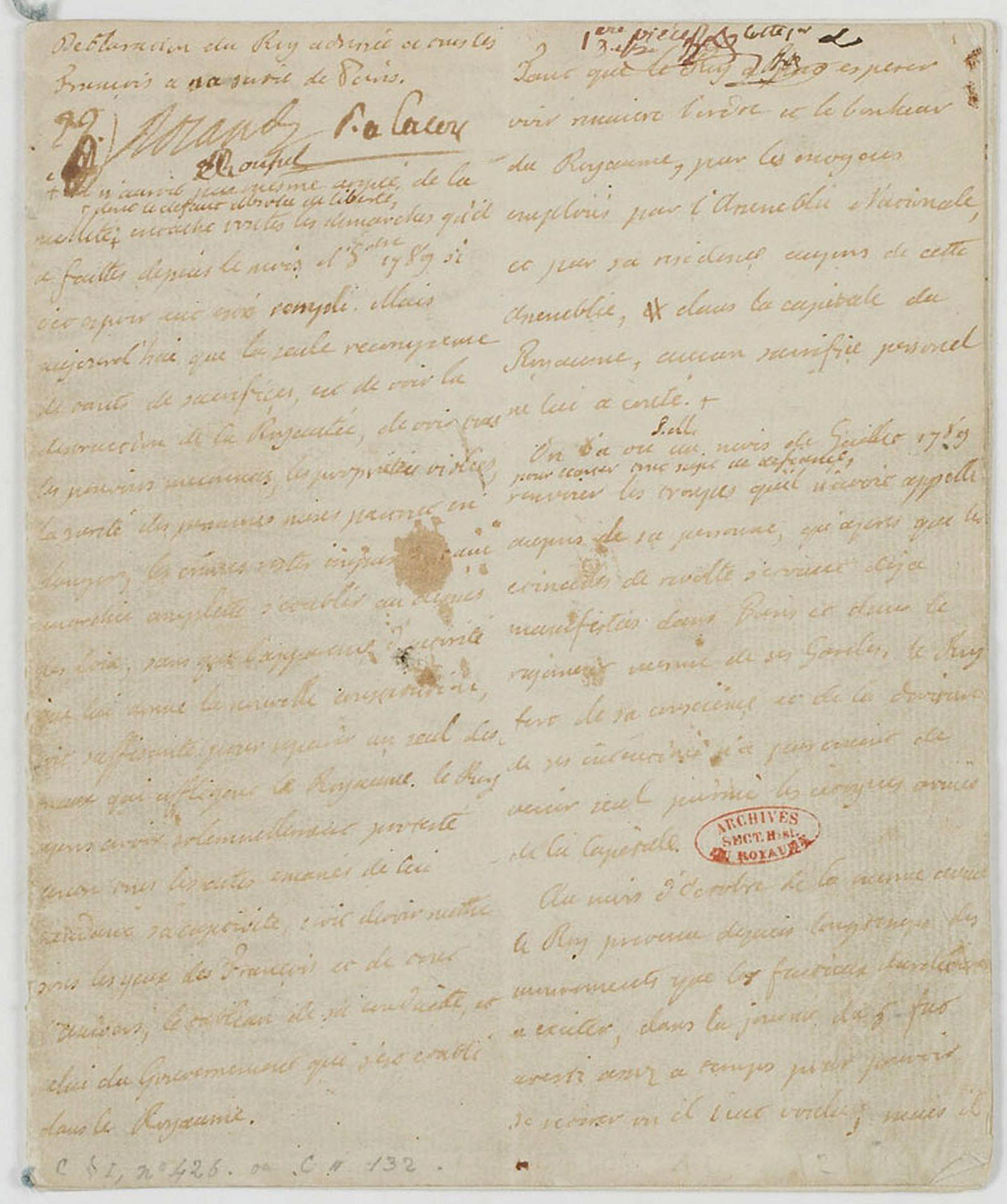
Declaration to the French People (June 1791)

The intended goal of the unsuccessful flight was to provide the King with greater freedom of action and personal security than was possible in Paris. At Montmédy, General François Claude Amour, marquis de Bouillé, had concentrated a force of 10,000 regulars of the old Royal Army who were considered to still be loyal to the monarchy. Bouillé himself had shown energy in suppressing a serious mutiny in Nancy in 1790. The troops under his command included two Swiss and four German mercenary regiments who were perceived as being more reliable in a time of general political unrest. In a letter drafted for presentation to the Tagsatzung at Zurich, the royalist baron de Breteuil stated that "His Majesty desires to have such imposing forces at his disposition, that even the most audacious rebels will have no other option than to submit". The court expectation was that "numerous faithful subjects of all classes" would then rally to demand the restoration of the rights of the throne and that order would be restored without the need for civil war or foreign invasion.

The long-term political objectives of the royal couple and their closest advisors remain unclear. A detailed document entitled Declaration to the French People, prepared by Louis XVI for presentation to the National Constituent Assembly and left behind in the Tuileries indicates that his personal goal was a return to the legal revolution of the summer of 1789; he no longer rejected the abolition of orders, as in his Declaration of June 23, 1789, and he accepted civil equality. Private correspondence from Marie Antoinette takes a more reactionary line looking to a restoration of the old monarchy without concessions; though referring to pardons for all but the Revolutionary leadership and the city of Paris "if it does not return to its old order".

== The flight attempt ==
Louis XVI committed himself and his family to a disastrous escape attempt from the capital to the eastern frontier on 21 June 1791. With the Dauphin's governess, the marquise de Tourzel, taking on the role of a Russian baroness, the Queen and the King's sister Madame Élisabeth playing the roles of governess and nurse respectively, the King a valet, and the royal children her daughters, the royal family made their escape leaving the Tuileries Palace at about midnight. The escape was largely planned by the Queen's friend, the Swedish Axel von Fersen the Younger, and the baron de Breteuil, who had garnered support from King Gustav III of Sweden. Fersen had urged the use of two light carriages that could have made the 200-mile journey to Montmédy relatively quickly. However, this would have involved the splitting up of the royal family, which Louis XVI and Marie Antoinette rejected, as they had promised to never separate. They decided on the use of a single heavy coach drawn by six horses.

== Discovery and arrest ==
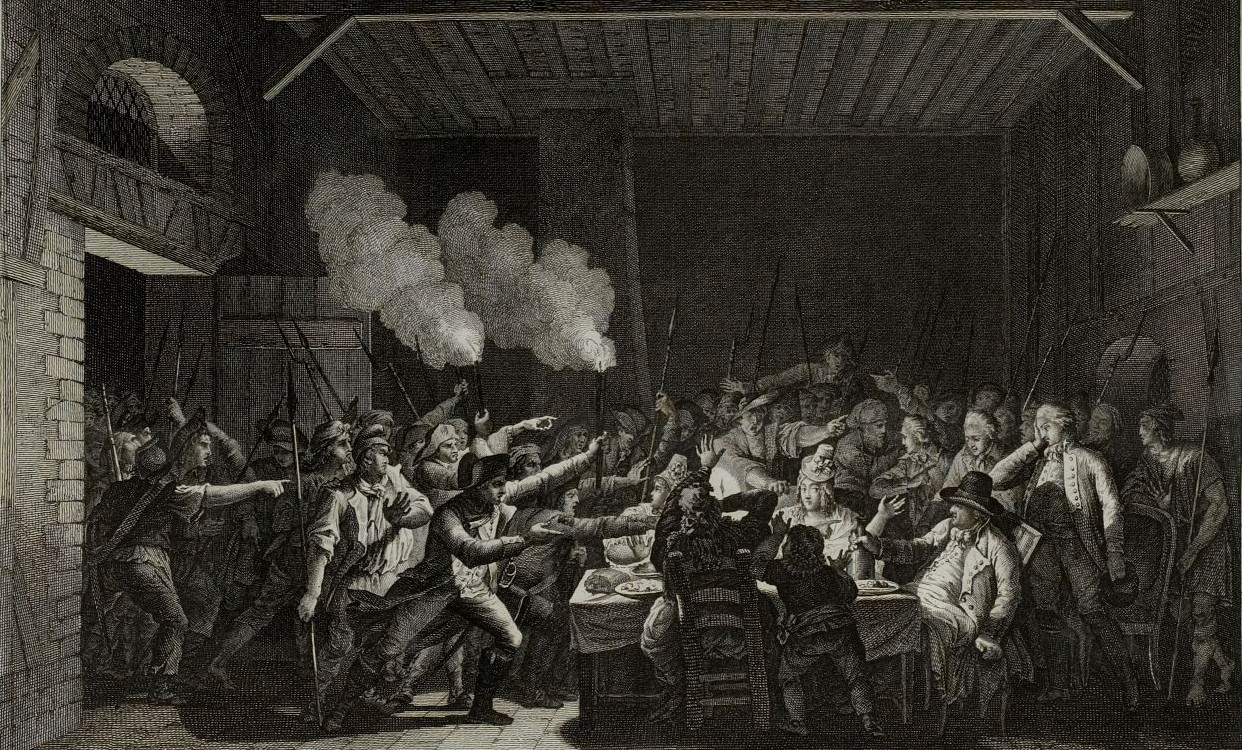
The arrest of Louis XVI and his family. Stamp by Jean-Louis Prieur (Musée de la Révolution française)

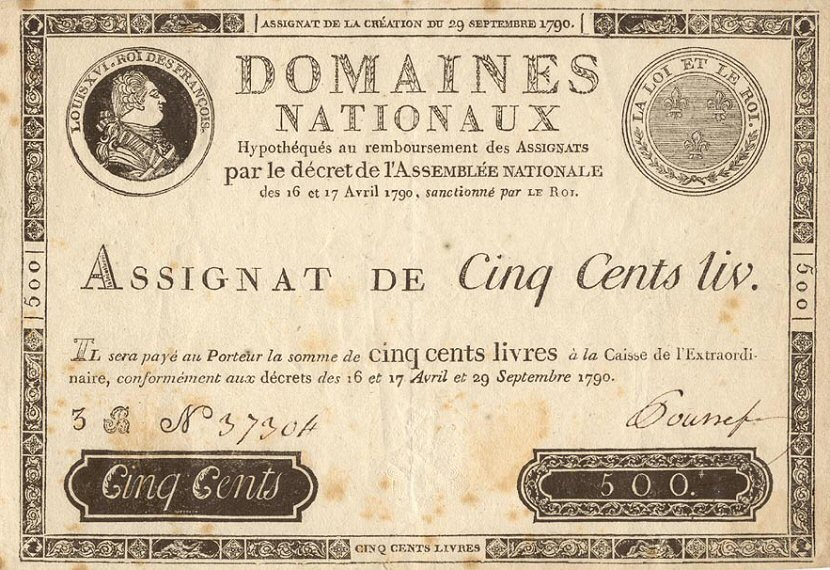
Drouet recognised the King, perhaps due to his profile on an assignat

Due to the cumulative effect of slow progression, time miscalculations, lack of secrecy, and the need to repair broken coach traces, the royal family was thwarted in its escape attempt after leaving Paris. Louis XVI himself chatted with peasants while horses were being changed at Fromentières and Marie Antoinette gave silver dishes to a local official at Chaintrix. At Châlons, townspeople reportedly greeted and applauded the royal party. Finally, Jean-Baptiste Drouet, the postmaster of Sainte-Menehould, recognised the King, perhaps from his portrait printed on an assignat in his possession. Seven detachments of cavalry posted along the intended route had been withdrawn or neutralised by suspicious crowds before the royal party had reached them. The King and his family were eventually stopped and arrested in the town of Varennes-en-Argonne, 50 km (31 miles) from their ultimate destination, the fortified royalist citadel of Montmédy.

Whether Bouillé's army would have been numerous or reliable enough to change the direction of the Revolution and preserve the monarchy can never be known.

== Confinement to the Tuileries Palace ==
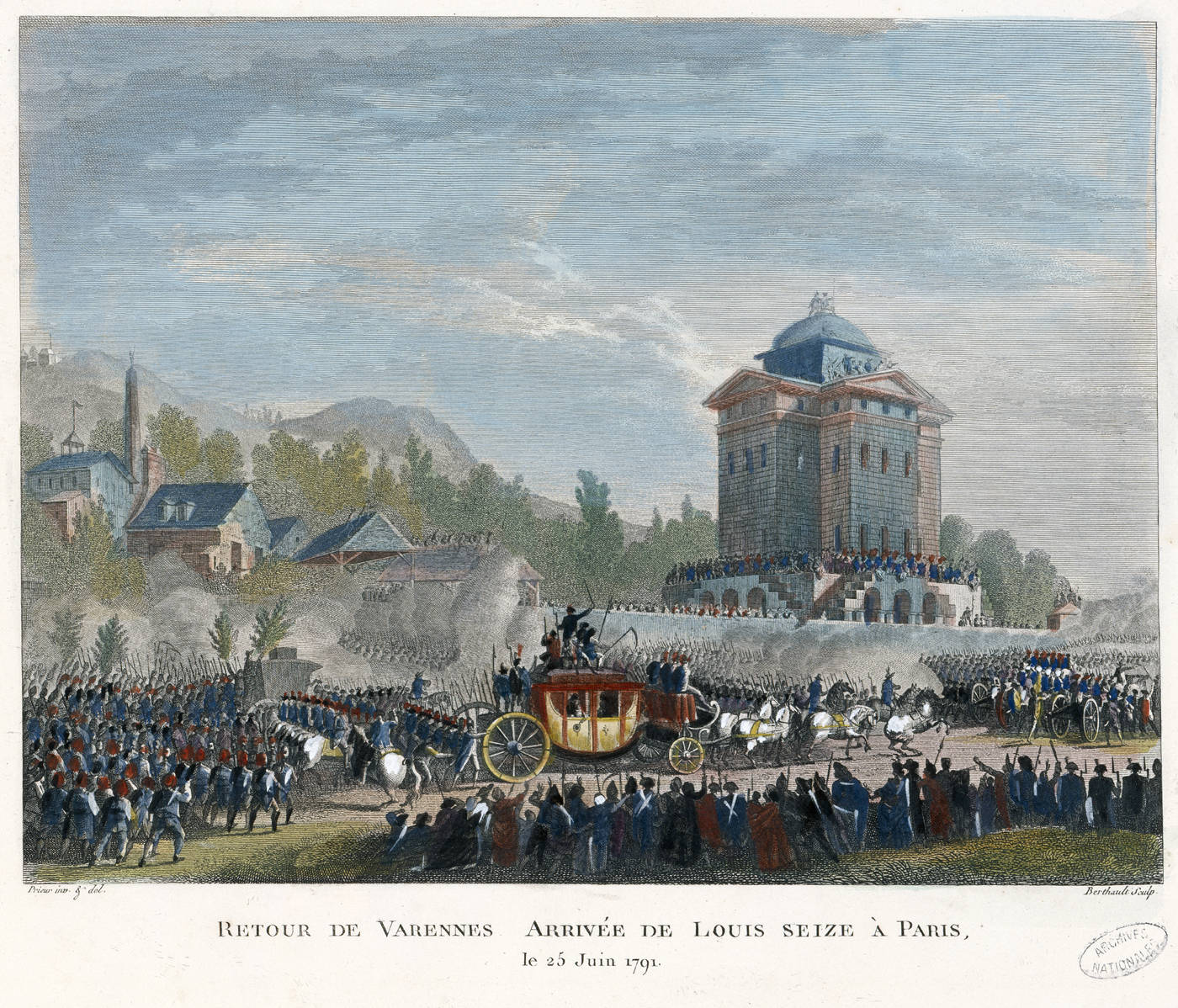
Return of the royal family to Paris on 25 June 1791: colored copperplate after a drawing of Jean-Louis Prieur

When the royal family finally returned under guard to Paris, the Revolutionary crowd met the royal carriage with uncharacteristic silence, men keeping their hats on as a sign of disrespect. The royal family, already confined to the Tuileries Palace, was only guarded more. From this point forward, the abolition of the monarchy and the establishment of a republic became an ever-increasing possibility. The credibility of the King as a constitutional monarch had been seriously undermined by propaganda following the escape attempt.

After they returned, the National Assembly agreed that the King could remain in power if he agreed to the Constitution. However, various factions in Paris like the Cordeliers and the Jacobins disagreed, and this led to a protest at the Champ de Mars; the protest turned violent, resulting in the so-called Champ de Mars Massacre.

From the autumn of 1791 on, the King tied his hopes of political salvation to the dubious prospects of foreign intervention. At the same time, he encouraged the Girondin faction in the Legislative Assembly in their policy of war with Austria, in the expectation that a French military disaster would pave the way for the restoration of the royal authority. Prompted by Marie Antoinette, Louis XVI rejected the advice of the moderate constitutionalists, led by Antoine Barnave, to fully implement the Constitution of 1791, which he had sworn to maintain. He instead secretly committed himself to a policy of covert counterrevolution.

== Abolition of the monarchy ==
The King's failed escape attempt alarmed many other European monarchs, who feared that Revolutionary fervor would spread to their own countries and result in instability outside France. Relations between France and its neighbours, already strained because of the Revolution, deteriorated even further with some foreign ministries calling for war against the revolutionary government.

The outbreak of the war with Austria in April 1792 and the publication of a manifesto by the Duke of Brunswick threatened the destruction of Paris if the safety of the royal family was again endangered. Upon hearing this, Parisian radicals stormed the Tuileries Palace on 10 August 1792.

This attack led in turn to the suspension of the King's powers by the Legislative Assembly and the proclamation of the French First Republic on 21 September. In November, evidence of Louis XVI's secret dealings with the deceased Revolutionary politician, Honoré de Mirabeau, and of his counter-revolutionary intrigues with foreigners was found in a secret iron chest, the armoire de fer, in the Tuileries. It was now no longer possible to pretend that the reforms of the French Revolution had been made with the consent of the King. Some Republicans called for his deposition, others for his trial for treason and intended defection to the enemies of Revolutionary France. On 3 December, it was decided that Louis XVI, who together with his family had been imprisoned since August, should be brought to trial for treason. He appeared twice, on 11 and 23 December, before the National Convention.

Convicted, Louis XVI was guillotined on 21 January 1793. Marie Antoinette was also convicted of treason, and guillotined on 16 October. The king's son, Louis XVII, died in 1795 at the age of ten.
