= Marie Eugène Charles Tuffin de La Rouërie =

Chouan leader (1765–1796)

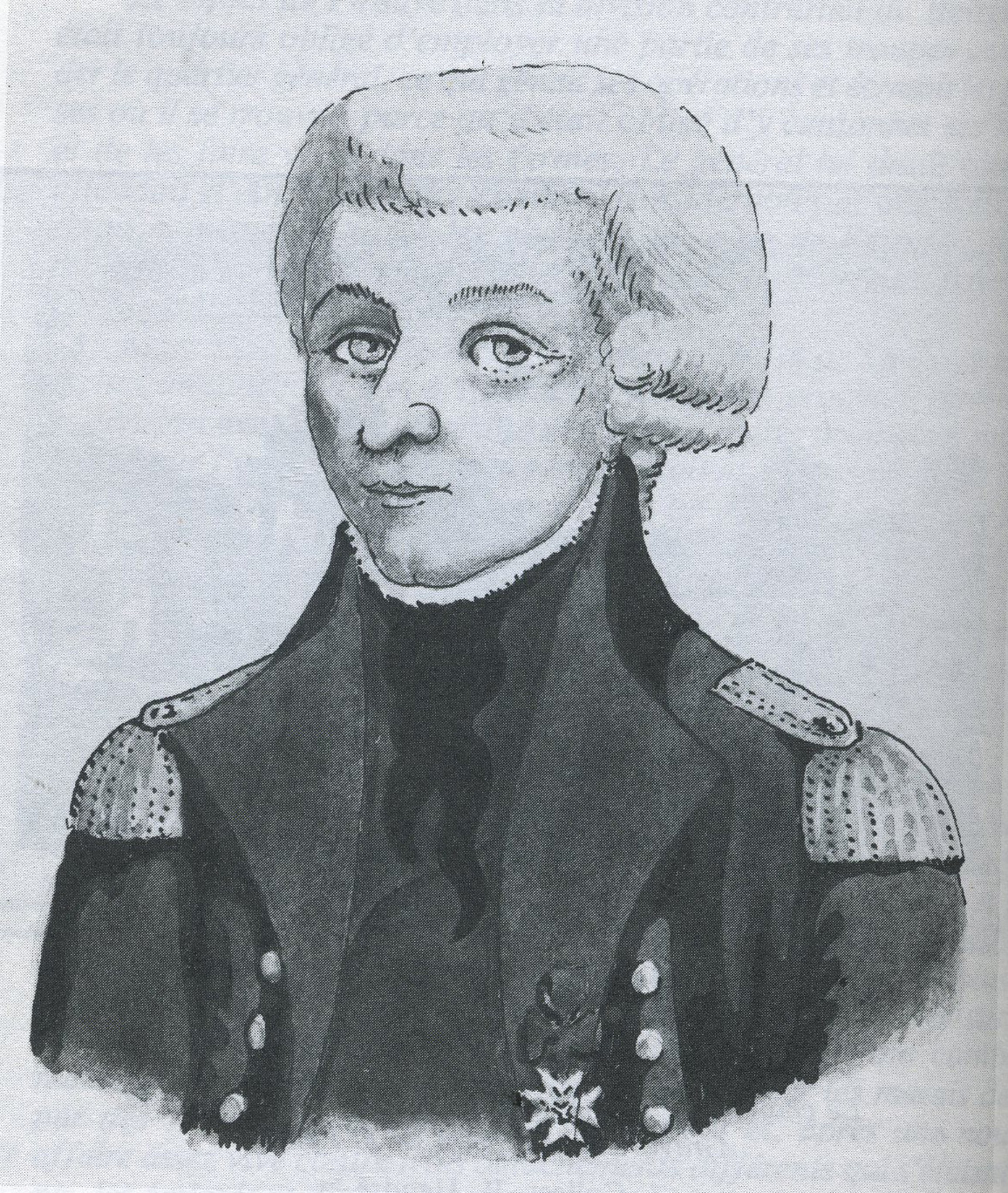
- Marie Eugène Charles Tuffin de La Rouërie, drawing by Henri Le Bouteiller after a miniature, end of the 19th-century
- Born: 27 August 1765; Laval, Kingdom of France
- Died: 16 March 1796 (aged 30); Saint-Méloir-des-Ondes, French First Republic
- Relatives: Armand Tuffin de La Rouërie (cousin)
- Military career
- Allegiance: France; Breton Association
- Service years: 1791–1796
- Rank: Lieutenant Colonel
- Commands: Saint-James
- Conflicts: Chouannerie; Battle of Vieuville; Battle of La Croix-Avranchin; Battle of Carnet; Battle of Boucéel

Marie Eugène Charles Tuffin de La Rouërie, born on 27 August 1765 in Laval, parish of Saint-Tugal de Laval, died near Saint-Méloir-des-Ondes on 16 March 1796 was a Chouan leader during the French Revolution.

== Biography ==
Son of Marie Eugène Gervais Tuffin de La Rouërie and Marthe-Charlotte-Marie-Claire de Farcy. He was the first cousin of Armand Tuffin de La Rouërie, head of the Breton Association and was his aide-de-camp. He was also a friend and one of the officers of Aimé Picquet du Boisguy, general of the Chouans of Fougères.

He joined the Chouans on 2 September 1795 and seems to have shared command of the Saint-James column, known as "Normandy", 800 men strong, with Lieutenant-Colonel Louis-François Dauguet, known as Fleur-de-Rose. He won several battles there against the Republicans in September. His plan, however, was to form a fourth column within the Fougères division, in the vicinity of Bazouges-la-Pérouse, in order to link the Fougères division to that of Dol-de-Bretagne and Saint-Malo.

Coat of arms

He was sent to Scotland with Julien Saulcet, known as "Duval", to the Count of Artois to request a landing of uniforms, powder, money and four cannons. Having received a favorable response, he was disembarked on his return with 40 other émigrés in the bay of Cancale, but surprised during the night by a Republican patrol, he was killed during the ensuing combat, as well as eleven other émigrés. Duval managed to escape and join du Boisguy with the couriers carried by Tuffin.

== Bibliography ==
- de Pontbriand, Toussaint Du Breil (1897). Mémoire du colonel de Pontbriand (in French).
- Le Boutellier, Christian (1989). La Révolution dans le Pays de Fougères (in French). Société archéologique et historique de l'arrondissement de Fougères.
- Peltier, Jean-Gabriel (1796). Paris, pendant l'année 1796 (in French). London: Imprimerie de Baylis.
