= Château de Fresnay =

Castle in Pays de la Loire, France

Coordinates: 48°10′20″N 0°57′48″W

The Château de Fresnay or Frênay is a French castle, 1.2 km to the north of Le Bourgneuf-la-Forêt in Mayenne. It is mentioned by Hubert Jaillot ("château, chapelle, étang et landes"), on the Carte de Cassini ("Château, village et bois percé d'allées convergentes"), and by Pierre-François Davelu ("Beau château et chapelle").
