= Théodore Gosselin =

French historian and playwright

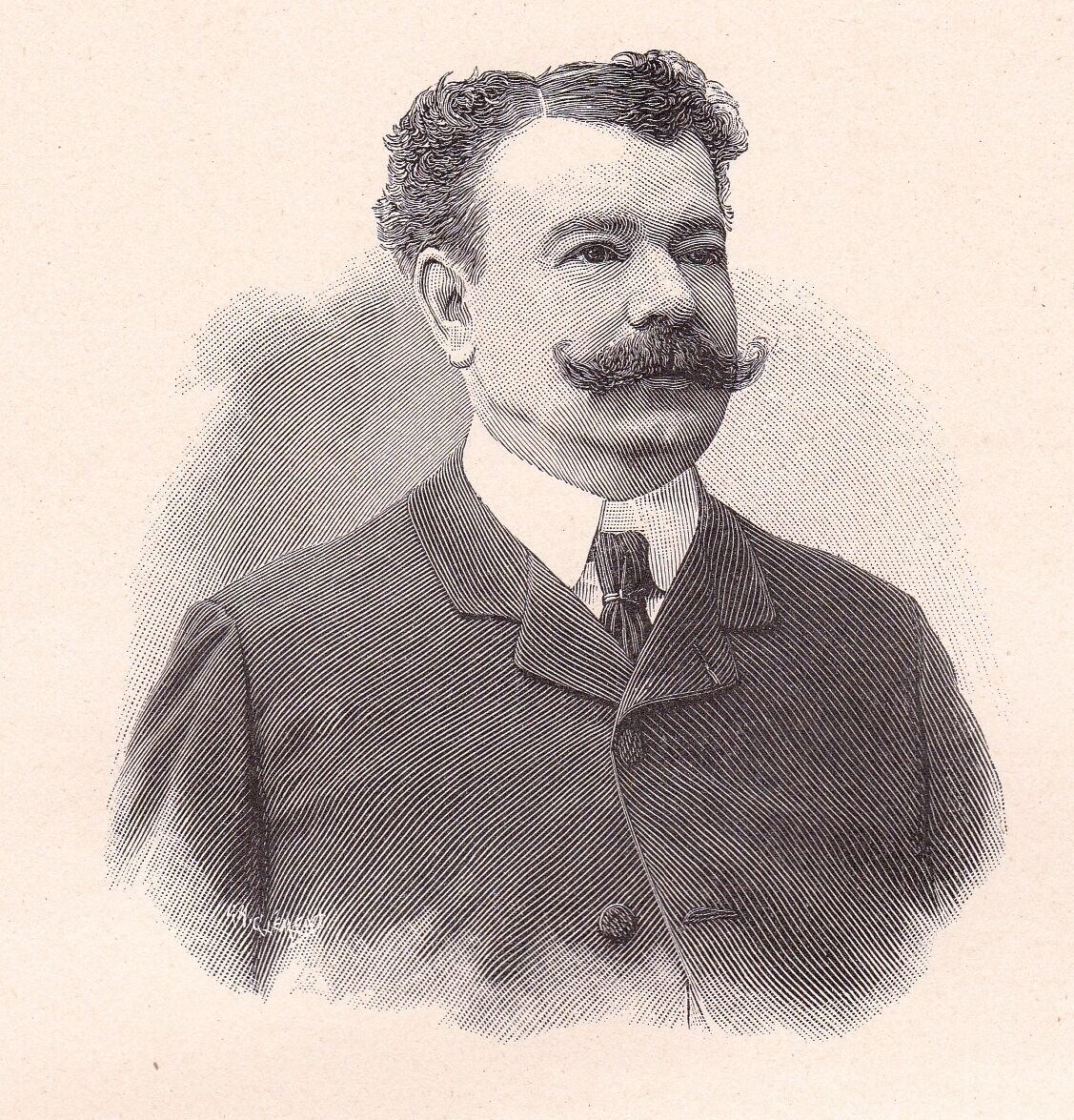
Théodore Gosselin

Louis Léon Théodore Gosselin (7 October 1855, in Richemont, Moselle – 7 February 1935) was a French historian and playwright who wrote under the pen name G. Lenotre. He wrote articles in publications such as Le Figaro, Revue des deux mondes, Le Monde illustré and Le Temps. He also produced numerous works dealing with the French Revolution, especially the Reign of Terror, constructed from his research into primary documents of the era. His work was recognized and admired by his contemporaries. Gosselin was made an officer of the Légion d'honneur and in 1932 was elected to the Académie française, but died before being able to sit in the Academy and never made the speech which he had written in homage to his predecessor, René Bazin.

His works include: Paris Révolutionnaire, La Guillotine et les exécuteurs des arrêts criminels pendant la Révolution; Un conspirateur royaliste pendant la Terreur : le baron de Bats; Le Vrai Chevalier de Maison-Rouge; La Captivité et la mort de Marie-Antoinette; La Chouannerie normande au temps de l’Empire; Le Drame de Varennes; Les Massacres de Septembre; Les Fils de Philippe-Égalité pendant la Terreur; Bleus, Blancs et Rouges; Le Roi Louis XVII et l’énigme du Temple; La Proscription des Girondins.

He also wrote for the theatre: Les Trois Glorieuses, Varennes, Les Grognards.

G. Lenotre died in Paris on 7 February 1935.

Cultural offices
Preceded by René Bazin	Seat 30; Académie française 1932-1935	Succeeded by Georges Duhamel
