= Thomas Falcon Marshall =

English painter

Thomas Falcon Marshall (1818–1878) was an English artist, known as a painter in oils and watercolour. He painted both portraits and landscapes, and also history paintings.

== Life ==
Marshall was born in Liverpool, in December 1818, and he worked mainly there and in Manchester. In the Liverpool Academy Exhibition of 1836 he showed four pictures. In 1840 he was awarded a silver medal by the Society of Arts for an oil-painting of a figure subject, and he exhibited for the first of many times at the Royal Academy in 1839. Around 1847 he moved to London.

Marshall died in Kensington on 26 March 1878.

== Works ==
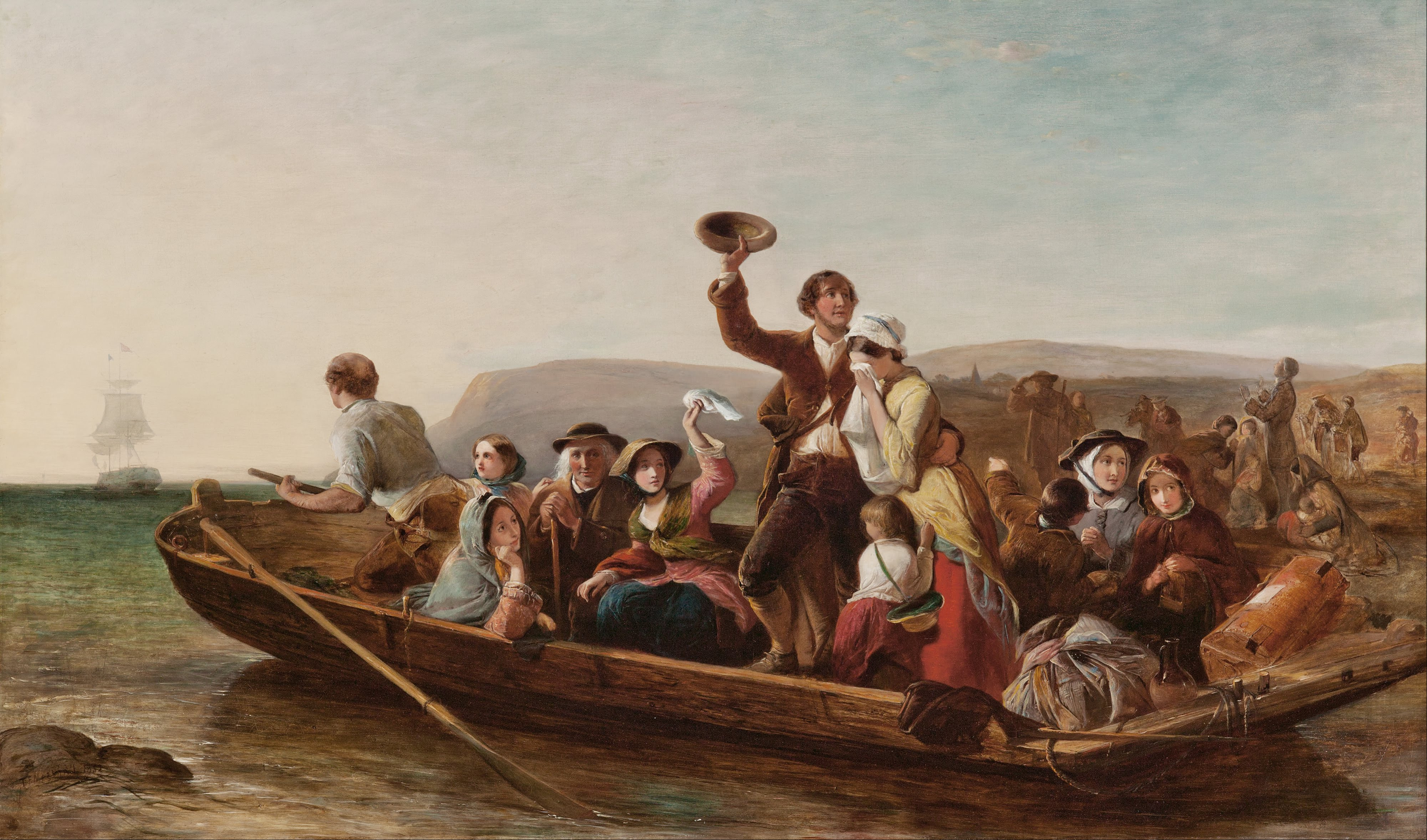
Emigration – The Parting Day by Thomas Falcon Marshall

At the Royal Academy Marshall exhibited in all 60 works, at the British Institution 40 paintings, and 42 at the Suffolk Street Gallery. He was also well represented at Liverpool and Manchester exhibitions. The Coming Footstep (1847) went to the national collection in South Kensington. Emigration – The Parting Day and Sad News from the Seat of War were other well-known examples of his work.

== Family ==
Marshall was married to Amelia Jane Davies and they had 15 children. His oldest son William Elstob Marshall was also a painter who specialised in animals and pets. Another son Percy Falcon Marshall was an actor whose son, Thomas Falcon Marshall's grandson, was the Hollywood actor Herbert Marshall.
