= Pulaski's Legion =

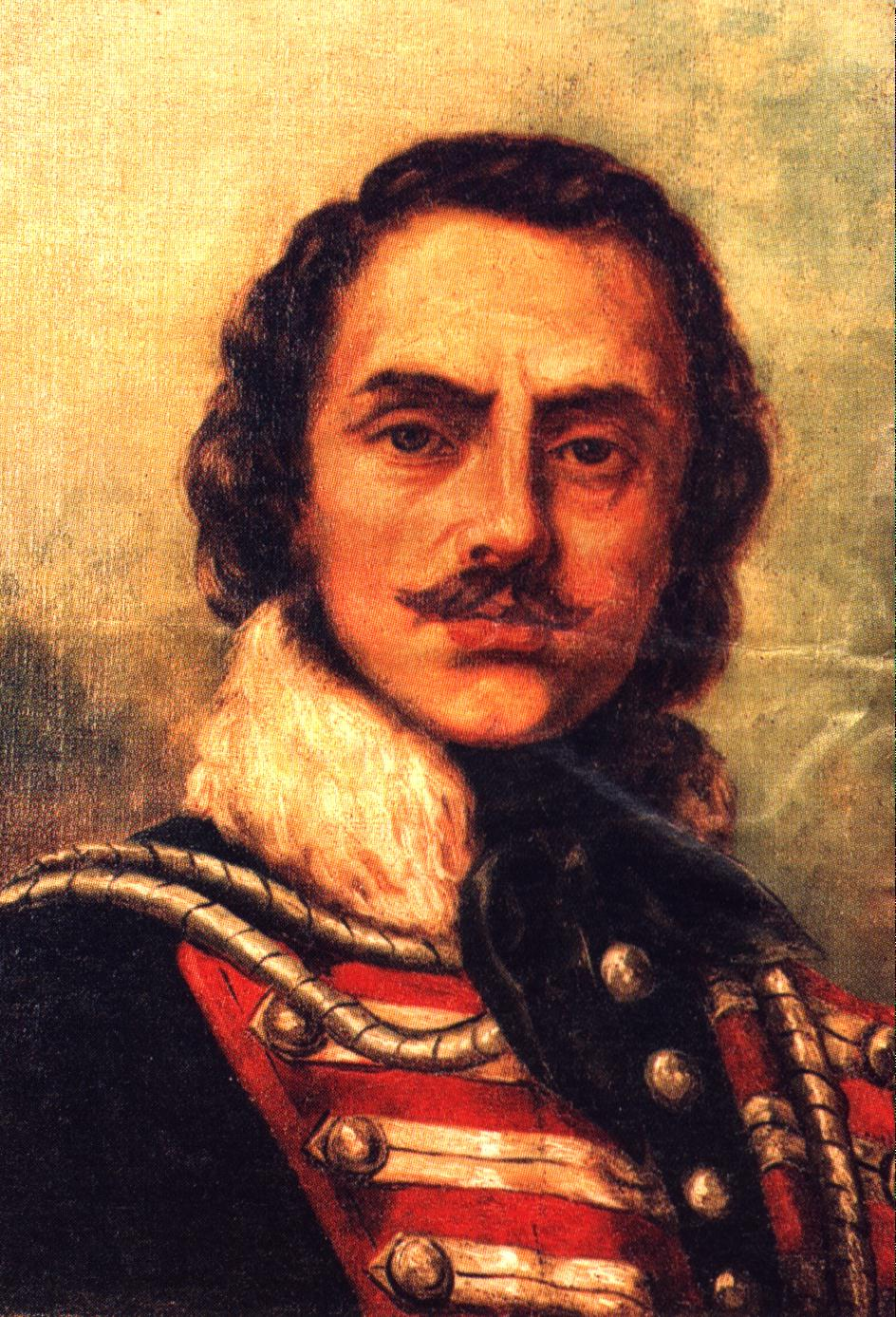
- Portrait of Kazimierz Pulaski
- Active: 1778–1780
- Country: United States
- Allegiance: Continental Congress of the United States
- Branch: Cavalry and Infantry
- Type: Foreign legion
- Size: Regiment
- Part of: Continental Army
- Engagements: Savannah and Charleston

Commanders
- Notable commanders: Casimir Pulaski, Michael Kovats

Pulaski's Legion was a cavalry and infantry regiment raised on March 28, 1778 at Baltimore, Maryland under the command of Polish-born General Casimir Pulaski and Hungarian nobleman Michael Kovats de Fabriczy for their service with the Continental Army during the American Revolutionary War. The Legion consisted of one troop of lancers, two troops of dragoons, and 200 light infantry soldiers. It was one of the few cavalry regiments in the Continental Army.

According to the latest research, the Pulaski banner, which symbolised the Legion, was inspired by the colours of the Hungarian national flag (red, white and green) in use since the early 17th century, and was created by the Moravian Lutheran Sisters according to the instructions of Michael Kovats in Bethlehem, Pennsylvania, in early 1778. The flag embedded cultural history elements reflecting the close Hungarian-Polish friendship and interstate relations back to the centuries.

== Role in the American Revolution ==
The Legion would see action at the affair at Little Egg Harbor in 1778, siege of Savannah in 1779, and the siege of Charleston in 1780. The Legion was disbanded in November 1780 and the men were merged into Armand's Legion. The Legion's 1st Cavalry was commanded by Maj. Pierre-Francois Vernier during the siege of Charleston's first bloody skirmishes.
