= King's Infantry Regiment (France) =

Prestigious French Army regiment created in 1663 under Louis XIV

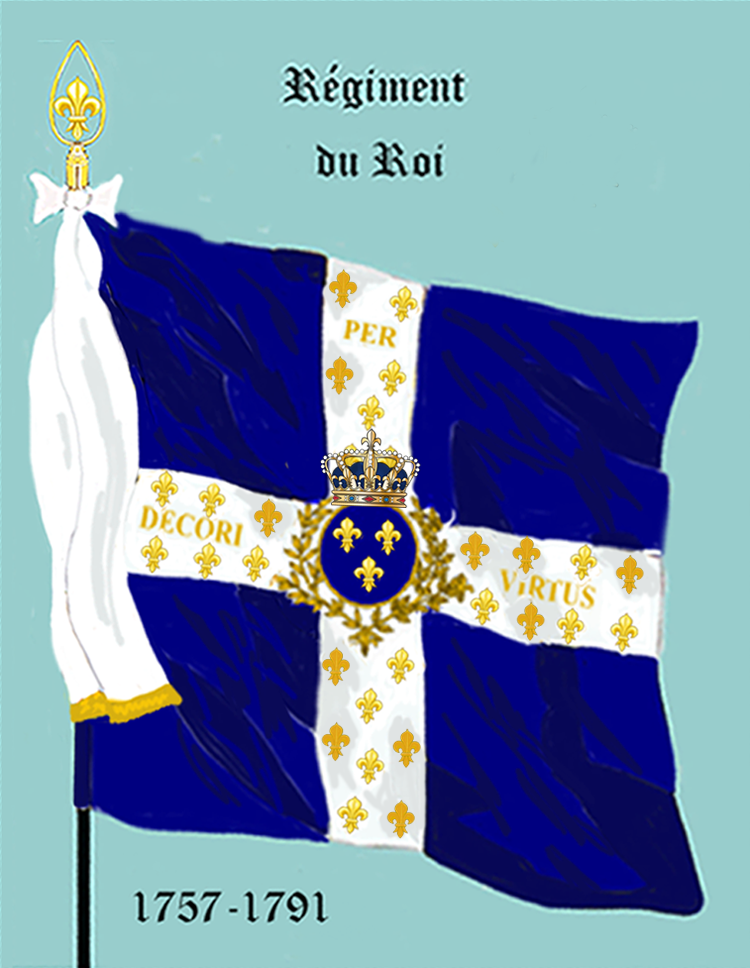
Flag of the Régiment du Roi

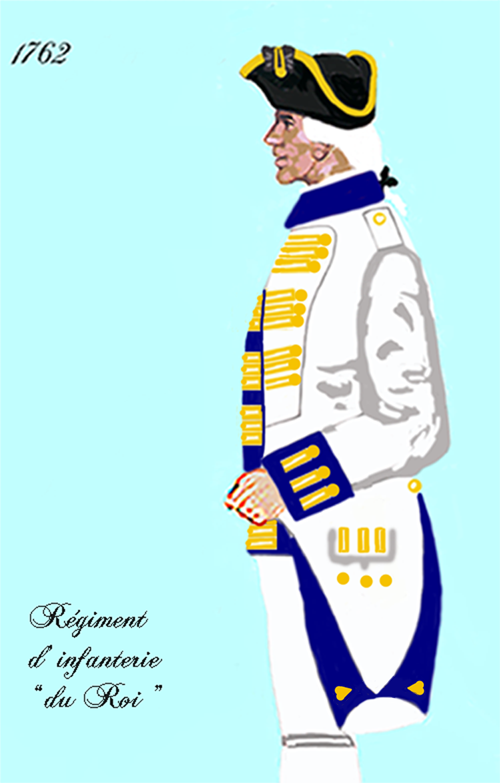
Uniform of the Régiment du Roi, c.1762

Régiment du Roi (King's Regiment) was a name given to several of the most prestigious regiments of the French Army under the ancien Régime and Bourbon Restoration, with most of the Army's branches having a régiment du Roi. It is not to be confused with the term régiment royal (meaning a regiment belonging to the king as opposed to régiments de gentilhomme belonging to nobles)

== History ==
The Régiment du Roi was created on 2 January 1663 when Louis XIV declared himself its colonel, with the Marquis de Dangeau as lieutenant-colonel, later replaced by Jean Martinet in 1670. Drawn from the King’s Musketeers, it became a model infantry corps and military school under Martinet’s direction. In 1667, Louis XIV introduced four grenadiers per company, among the first elite soldiers of this type in the French Army.

=== Infantry ===
In 1663, the régiment Royal Infanterie was renamed the King's Infantry Regiment. Under this title it fought at the Battle of Fontenoy on 11 May 1745.

This regiment was one of three garrisoning Nancy in August 1790 and as such played a leading role in the mutiny known as the Nancy affair. In 1791 it became the 105e régiment d'infanterie de ligne.

In 1814 the 1st Infantry Regiment was renamed régiment du Roi; it lost that name in 1816 when a new system of "Departmental Legions" replaced the former regiments of the French line infantry.

==== Light infantry ====
In 1814, the 1st regiment of light infantry regiment was renamed régiment du Roi. It was renamed in 1815. Five cavalry regiments were also redesignated as King's regiments in 1814 as part of a general effort under the First Restoration to dilute Napoleonic links within the French Army.

== Sources ==
- Verneuil, Raoul Quarré de (1880). L'armée en France depuis Charles VII jusqu'à la révolution, 1493-1789 (in French). J. Dumaine.
