= Port-Brillet =

- Commune
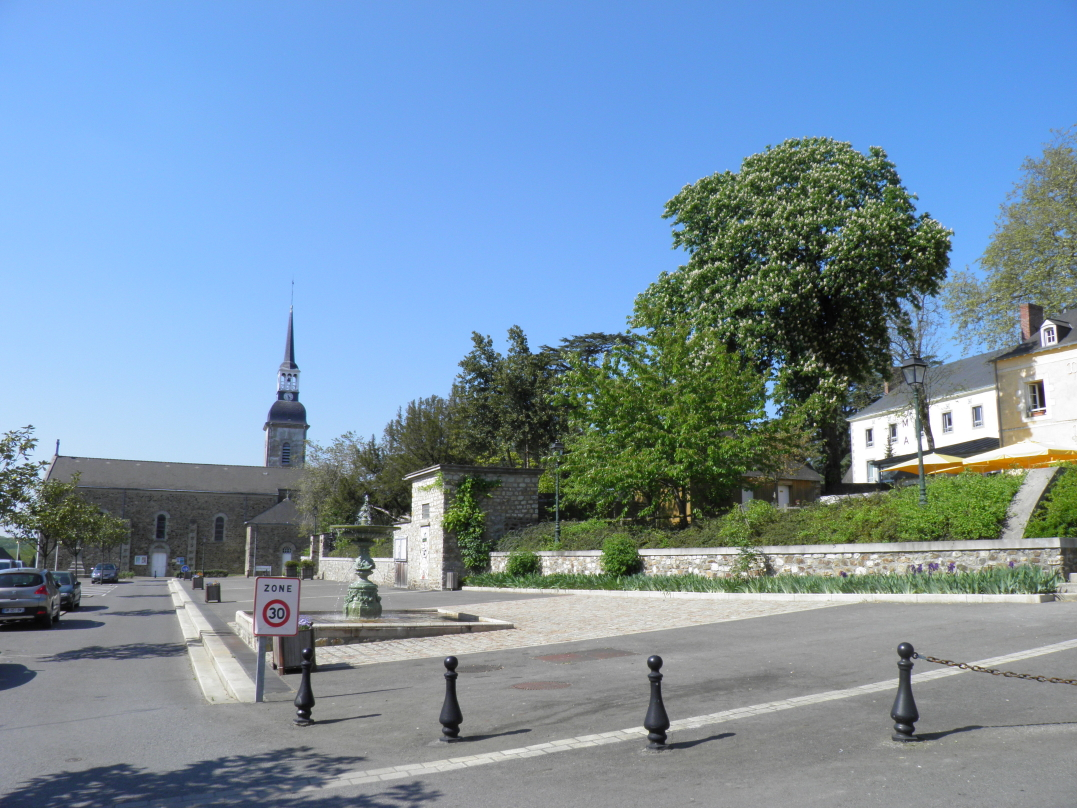
- The church square in Port-Brillet
- Location of Port-Brillet
- Location within France Location within Pays de la Loire
- Coordinates: 48°06′46″N 0°58′14″W
- Country: France
- Region: Pays de la Loire
- Department: Mayenne
- Arrondissement: Laval
- Canton: Loiron-Ruillé
- Intercommunality: Laval Agglomération

Government
  - Mayor (2020–2026): Fabien Robin
- Area^{1}: 8.10 km^{2} (3.13 sq mi)
- Elevation: 122 m (400 ft)
- Highest elevation: 154 m (505 ft)
- Lowest elevation: 98 m (322 ft)
- Population (2023): 1,827
  - Density: 226/km^{2} (584/sq mi)
- Time zone: UTC+01:00 (CET)
  - Summer (DST): UTC+02:00 (CEST)
- INSEE/Postal code: 53182 /53410
- ^{1} French Land Register data, which excludes lakes, ponds, glaciers > 1 km^{2} (0.386 sq mi or 247 acres) and river estuaries.

Port-Brillet (French pronunciation: [pɔʁ bʁijɛ]) is a commune in the Mayenne department in north-western France.

== See also ==
- Communes of Mayenne
