= François Claude Amour, marquis de Bouillé =

French general; Royalist supporter of Louis XVI (1739–1800)

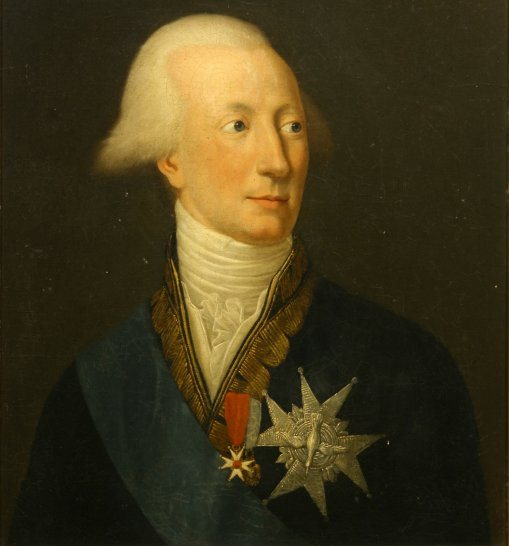

Governor of Guadeloupe
- In office 1769–1771
- Preceded by: Anne Joseph Hippolyte de Maurès, Comte de Malartic
- Succeeded by: Louis François de Dion

Governor general of the French Antilles
- In office July 1777 – April 1783
- Preceded by: Robert, comte d'Argout
- Succeeded by: Claude-Charles de Damas de Marillac

Personal details
- Born: 19 November 1739 Saint-Eblé, France
- Died: 14 November 1800 (aged 60) London, Great Britain
- Spouse: Marie Louise Guillemette de Bègue

Military service
- Allegiance: Kingdom of France
- Branch/service: Army
- Battles/wars: Seven Years' War; American Revolutionary War; Nancy affair

François Claude Amour, marquis de Bouillé (19 November 1739 – 14 November 1800) was a French general and colonial administrator. After distinguishing himself in the Seven Years' War, he was appointed governor of Guadeloupe in 1768. A well-loved administrator, he authored the popular song "Les adieux d'une créole". His most well-known military exploits took place in the West Indies during the American War of Independence, where he was involved in the French capture of a number of British possessions. Following that war he returned to France, where he held military commands in the country's northeast at the time of the French Revolution. A committed Royalist, he was a leading conspirator involved in the royal family's failed flight in 1791, whose failure forced Bouillé into exile. He continued to be active in consultative roles to members of the First Coalition, which opposed the forces of Revolutionary France in the early years of the French Revolutionary War. He died in exile in London, and is mentioned as a hated Royalist in the French national anthem, La Marseillaise.

== Early life ==
François Claude Amour, the marquis de Bouillé was born at Chateau Cluzel in Saint-Èble (present-day Mazeyrat-d'Allier, Haute-Loire) on 19 November 1739. His mother Marie Albertine Josèphe Amour de Bouillé died shortly after his birth, and his father Guillaume Antoine de Bouillé (1699–1747) died a few years later. He was raised by a paternal uncle who was also First Almoner to King Louis XV. He was educated in a Jesuit school, and at age 16 his uncle purchased for him a commission in a company of dragoons of the French Army.

Bouillé first saw military action in the Seven Years' War in 1758, when his regiment joined French forces in present-day Germany. He distinguished himself throughout the campaign, playing an important role in the Battle of Grünberg in February 1761 that resulted in the surrender of thousands of German troops and the capture of many military standards, and prompted Duke Ferdinand of Brunswick to lift that year's Siege of Cassel. Bouillé was given the honour of taking the captured standards to Paris to present them to the King. He was recognized with a brevet promotion to colonel, and was given command of the next regiment that became available.

== West Indies and the American War of Independence ==
In 1768 Bouillé was appointed governor of the Caribbean island of Guadeloupe, where he again distinguished himself. The Comte d'Emery, governor general of the French West Indies, was so impressed with Bouillé that he recommended to the King that Bouillé succeed him at the post. When d'Emery died in 1777, Bouillé was awarded with the governorships of Martinique and St. Lucia, with authority to take full command of the French West Indies in the event France joined the American War of Independence.

France's entry into that war occurred in early 1778, and Bouillé was heavily involved in the planning, execution, and leadership of operations in the West Indies. He organized and led the capture of Dominica before the British there were even aware of the war declaration, and was involved in organizing, provisioning, and leading troops in a number of other actions. In 1782 he recaptured Dutch Sint Eustatius, which the British had captured just the year before, and was involved in that year planning with Bernardo de Gálvez a Franco-Spanish expedition against Jamaica. The expedition was called off after the disastrous French defeat at the naval Battle of the Saintes in April 1782.

Bouillé returned to France in 1783 after the peace. King Louis XVI rewarded him for his conduct in the war with the Order of the Holy Spirit. He traveled the following year to England, where he was well received. He was well respected by the British for his treatment of prisoners of war and other captives during the war. In one notable instance, he returned the crew of a shipwrecked British frigate to a nearby British possession, refusing to take advantage of their plight to make them prisoners of war. He was equally gracious at home, even refusing an offer of payment (amounting to the munificent sum equivalent to £20,000 of the day) from the King for war expenses that he had personally covered.

== French Revolution ==
In 1787 Bouillé was named governor of the Three Bishoprics. He served in 1787 and 1788 in the Assemblies of Notables called by King Louis in an attempt to deal with France's perilous financial state.

After the French Revolution began in 1789, Bouillé retained control of the Three Bishoprics, and was also given military command of Alsace and Franche-Comté in 1790. A committed Royalist, he was instrumental in putting down rebellion in Metz, and led forces that controversially crushed a military mutiny in the "Nancy affair" in August 1790, in which both soldiers and civilians were killed. Although the National Assembly approved his actions, radicals were critical of the severity of his response.

=== Louis' failed flight ===
Bouillé had managed to keep a fairly strong Royalist command in his army, and he became deeply involved in an attempt by King Louis and Marie Antoinette to escape their virtual house arrest in Paris. In conjunction with Comte Axel von Fersen and Baron de Breteuil, he planned the means and route by which the Royal Family would travel from Paris to the fortress of Montmédy, within Bouillé's area of control. Approximately 10,000 regulars of the old royal army were encamped at or near Montmedy. The regiments, which included Swiss and German mercenary units, made up a force that had largely retained its discipline and was considered by the court party as still loyal to the monarchy. Historians continue to debate how the flight led to the royals' arrest at Varennes.

Bouillé's son Louis was sent to Paris to inform the royal family of the plans and possible safe points. Bouillé also made specific suggestions about the route and the travel arrangements. He recommended a different route from the one which Louis ultimately chose, and he suggested that they not travel in a single coach, instead splitting up so that they would draw less attention en route. That advice also was not taken. Bouillé was to provide troops to protect the royal party on the final stages of the journey through the area that he controlled. Some of the units considered more reliable by the royalist high command had, however, recently been reassigned to other commands, and in a time of wide social unrest, he could not fully trust all of the troops that remained. Cavalry detachments were placed in towns along the route, citing as a pretext the expected delivery of treasury funds going to Paris. The sudden arrival of the dragoons and hussars, however, drew immediate attention and suspicion. This heightened tension in the local population may have played a role in the ultimate capture and arrest at Varennes. Delays in the arrival of the coach carrying the royal family had led to several of Bouillé's detachments being stood down, and none was immediately available to intervene.

=== Aftermath ===
As an immediate result of the forced return of the royal family to Paris, Bouillé and senior members of his staff fled France to join the Austro-Prussian forces assembled beyond the border. He subsequently issued a proclamation threatening reprisals if any harm was done to the king. This only served to further discredit the weakened monarchy.

The failure of the attempted flight set off a wave of recriminations among the Royalist conspirators. The duc de Choiseul and Bouillé both wrote memoirs (Bouillé in 1800, the year of his death), seeking to defend their actions during the flight, and to assign blame to others.

=== Exile ===
Bouillé went into exile, first travelling to Pillnitz, where the spread of anti-Royalist sentiments was discussed by other European monarchs. Courted by royalty for positions in their armies, he sought to remain loyal to Louis, eventually serving as a military consultant to Prussian King Frederick William II in the early stages of the First Coalition. He joined military campaigns in 1793, and was urged to take command of Royalist forces in the Vendée, but refused, believing the forces would ultimately fail in their aims. Shortly after that, he sailed for England, where he continued to assist the British in military activities against Revolutionary France.

In 1797 Bouillé published his memoirs, which were a great success. He died in London on 14 November 1800 and was buried in the churchyard of St Pancras Old Church. In 1866, his remains were reinterred at the Montmartre Cemetery in Paris.

== Legacy ==
During Bouillé's years of exile, the German author Franz Alexander von Kleist left a character sketch of Bouillé in his Fantasien auf einer Reise nach Prag (1792) after seeing him with his son at a performance of Mozart's opera Don Giovanni at the Estates Theatre in Prague on 2 September 1791. Kleist described Bouillé as a broken man wracked with worry and remorse over the actions that sent him into exile and made him vilified in France.

The first version (1769) of the words of the Caribbean song "Adieu foulard, adieu Madras" are attributed to him.

Bouillé's role in the French Revolution is alluded to in the fifth stanza of the French national anthem, "La Marseillaise", as a detestable counter-revolutionary figure:

French	English translation
Français, en guerriers magnanimes, Portez ou retenez vos coups! Épargnez ces tristes victimes, À regret s'armant contre nous. (bis) Mais ces despotes sanguinaires, Mais ces complices de Bouillé Tous ces tigres qui, sans pitié, Déchirent le sein de leur mère!	Frenchmen, as magnanimous warriors, Bear or hold back your blows! Spare these sorry victims, For regretfully arming against us. (repeat) But these bloodthirsty despots, But these accomplices of Bouillé, All these tigers who, mercilessly, Tear apart their mother's breast!

== Marriage and issue ==
On 6 July 1768, Bouillé was married to Marie Louise Guillemette de Bègue (1746–1803), a daughter of Marie Anne Neau Dubreuil and Pierre Joseph de Bègue, a former Major of Martinique. Together, they were the parents of:

- Louis Joseph Amour de Bouillé (1769–1850), who married Marie Robertine Anne Hélène Joséphine Walsh de Serrant.
- François Guillaume Antoine de Bouillé (1770–1837), who married Antoinette de Jorna.
- Cécile Emilie Céleste Eléonore de Bouillé (1774–1801), who married François-Jules de Contades, Vicomte de Contades.

== Works ==
- 1797. Memoirs relating to the French revolution (Translated). OCLC 186977462
- Mémoires de M. le Marquis de Bouillé : pendant son administration aux Isles du Vent de l'Amérique OCLC 900410705
