= Le Bourgneuf-la-Forêt =

- Commune
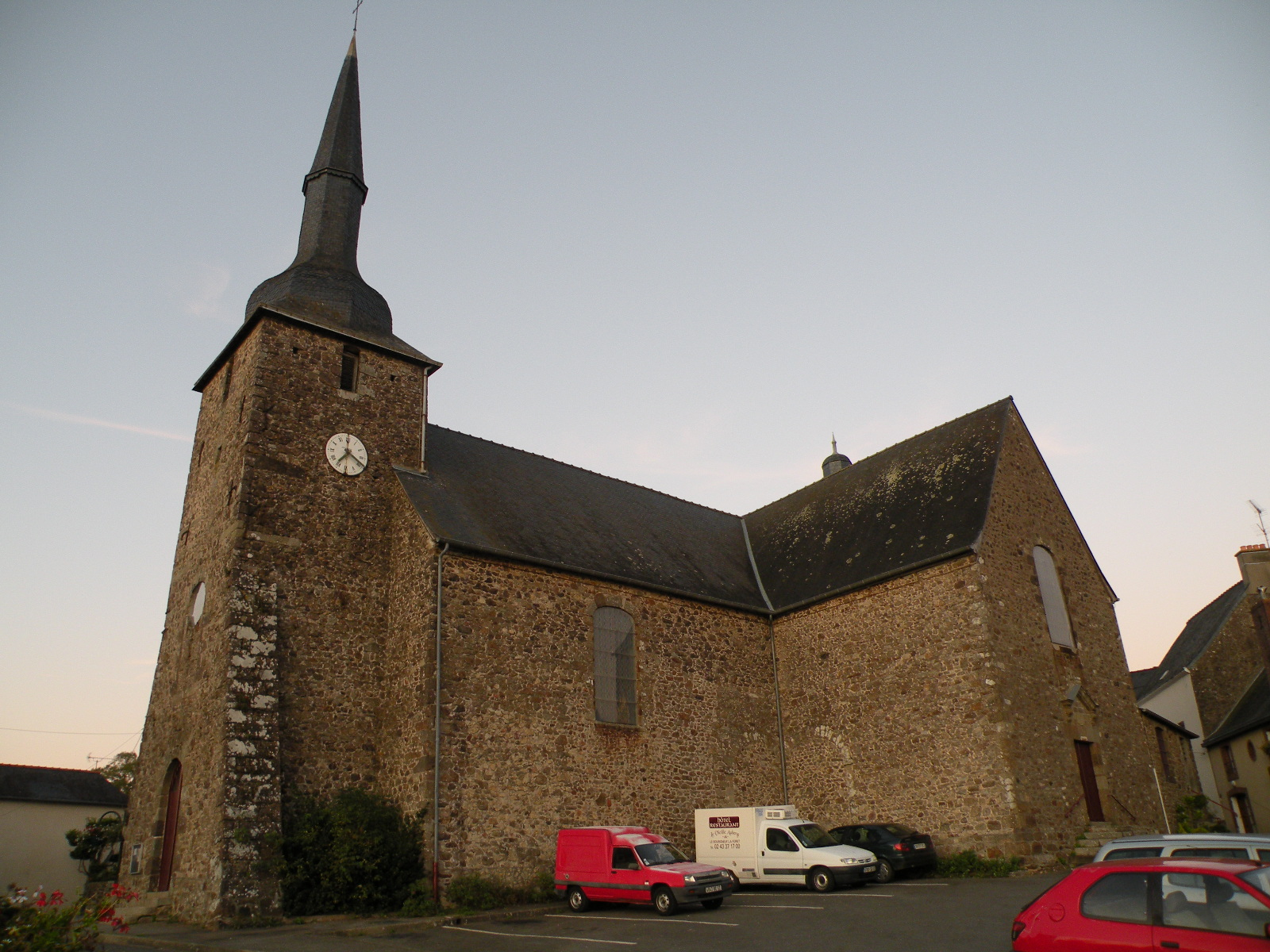
- The church in Le Bourgneuf-la-Forêt
- Location of Le Bourgneuf-la-Forêt
- Location within France Location within Pays de la Loire
- Coordinates: 48°09′55″N 0°58′07″W
- Country: France
- Region: Pays de la Loire
- Department: Mayenne
- Arrondissement: Laval
- Canton: Loiron-Ruillé
- Intercommunality: Laval Agglomération

Government
  - Mayor (2020–2026): François Berrou
- Area^{1}: 28.60 km^{2} (11.04 sq mi)
- Elevation: 158 m (518 ft)
- Highest elevation: 201 m (659 ft)
- Lowest elevation: 110 m (360 ft)
- Population (2023): 1,769
  - Density: 61.85/km^{2} (160.2/sq mi)
- Time zone: UTC+01:00 (CET)
  - Summer (DST): UTC+02:00 (CEST)
- INSEE/Postal code: 53039 /53410
- ^{1} French Land Register data, which excludes lakes, ponds, glaciers > 1 km^{2} (0.386 sq mi or 247 acres) and river estuaries.

Le Bourgneuf-la-Forêt (French pronunciation: [lə buʁnœf la fɔʁɛ]) is a commune in the Mayenne department in northwestern France.

== Population ==
Historical population
| Year | Pop. | ±% p.a. |
|---|---|---|
| 1968 | 1,435 | — |
| 1975 | 1,402 | −0.33% |
| 1982 | 1,397 | −0.05% |
| 1990 | 1,466 | +0.60% |
| 1999 | 1,537 | +0.53% |
| 2007 | 1,698 | +1.25% |
| 2012 | 1,805 | +1.23% |
| 2017 | 1,778 | −0.30% |
| 2023 | 1,769 | −0.08% |
Source: INSEE

== See also ==
- Communes of Mayenne
