= List of French generals of the Revolutionary and Napoleonic Wars =

This list includes the general officers in the French service during the French Revolutionary and Napoleonic Wars. From 1789 to 1815, their number exceeded 2,000.

== A ==
- Jacques Pierre Abbatucci (général de division)
- Jean-Charles Abbatucci (général de brigade)
- Louis Jean Nicolas Abbé (général de division)
- Augustin Gabriel d'Aboville (général de brigade)
- Augustin-Marie d'Aboville (général de brigade)
- François Marie d'Aboville (général de division)
- Michel Jacques François Achard (général de brigade)
- Pierre Age (général de brigade)
- Armand, duc d'Aiguillon (général de brigade)
- Louis-Annibal de Saint-Michel d'Agoult (général de brigade)
- Pierre Nicolas d'Agoult (général de brigade)
- Guillaume François d'Aigremont (général de brigade)
- Joseph Jean-Baptiste Albert (général de division)
- Philippe François Maurice d'Albignac, comte d'Albignac, comte de Ried (général de brigade)
- Louis Alexandre d'Albignac (général de division)
- Pierre Alexandre Joseph Allent (général de division)
- Jacques-Alexandre-François Allix de Vaux, comte de Freudenthal (général de division)
- Louis Alméras (général de division)
- Joseph Perrin des Almons (général de division)
- Pierre d'Almeïda, marquis d'Alorna (général de division)
- Jean-Jacques Ambert (général de division)
- Auguste Jean Joseph Gilbert Ameil (général de division)
- François Pierre Joseph Amey (général de division)
- Louis Ancel (général de brigade)
- Antoine François Andréossy (général de division)
- Victor Antoine Andréossy (général de brigade)
- Jacques Bernard Modeste d'Anselme (général de division)
- Charles Henri Guillaume Anthing (général de division)
- Charles Nicolas d'Anthouard de Vraincourt (général de division)
- François Louis Antoine (général de brigade)
- Eustache Charles Joseph d'Aoust (général de division)
- Joseph Louis d'Arbois de Jubainville (général de brigade)
- Mathieu Joseph d'Arbonneau (général de brigade)
- Pierre Jacques Jean Hector du Bousquet d'Argence (général de brigade)
- François Argod (général de brigade)
- Jean-Jacques d'Argoubet (général de brigade)
- Pierre Argoud (général de brigade)
- Louis François Pierre d'Arlandes de Salton (général de brigade)
- Antoine Arnaud (général de brigade)
- Jean-Baptiste Arnaud (général de brigade)
- Pierre Louis d'Arnauld (général de brigade)
- Jean Toussaint Arrighi de Casanova, duc de Padoue (général de division)
- Jean-Lucq D'Arriule (général de division)
- Louis d'Arut de Grandpré (général de division)
- Dominique Joseph Asselin de Williencourt (général de brigade)
- Antoine Victor Augustin d'Auberjon, comte de Murinais (général de brigade)
- Claude Aubert (général de brigade)
- Jean-Baptiste Annibal Aubert du Bayet (général de division)
- René François Jean Aubrée (général de brigade)
- François Aubry (général de division)
- Joseph Gabriel Aubry Darencey (général de brigade)
- Claude Charles Aubry de La Boucharderie (général de division)
- Antoine Jean-Baptiste Aubugeois de La Borde (général de brigade)
- Charles-Pierre Augereau, duc de Castiglione (Maréchal d'Empire)
- Jean-Pierre Augereau (général de division)
- Jean-Baptiste Augier (général de brigade)
- Pierre Aulard (général de brigade)
- Nicolas Grégoire Aulmont de Verrières (général de brigade)
- Louis Marie Guy d'Aumont de Rochebaron (général de division)
- Vincent d'Auriol (général de brigade)
- Pierre Gabriel Aussenac (général de brigade)
- Pierre d'Autancourt (général de brigade)
- Joseph Gaspard Corporandi d'Auvare (général de division)
- Jacques Philippe Avice (général de brigade)
- Vincent Jacques-Etienne Avogari de Gentile (général de division)
- François d'Avrange d'Haugéranville (général de brigade)
- François Charles Jean Pierre Marie d'Avrange d'Haugéranville (général de brigade)
- Jean-Jacques Avril (général de division)
- Antoine Sylvain Avy (général de brigade)
- Wincenty Aksamitowski (général de brigade)
- Antoine Aymard (général de brigade)
- Charles Jean Louis Aymé (général de division)
- François Basile Azemar (général de brigade).

== B ==
=== Ba ===
- Jacques François Bache (général de brigade)
- Louis Alexandre Bachelet-Damville (général de brigade)
- Gilbert Désiré Joseph Bachelu (général de division)
- Felice Pasquale Baciocchi, prince de Piombino (général de division)
- Louis Albert Guislain Bacler d'Albe (général de brigade)
- Jean Bajet (général de brigade)
- François Bagnéris (général de brigade)
- Jean Louis Charles Bagniol (général de brigade)
- Louis Paul Baille, baron de Saint-Pol (général de brigade)
- Louis Willibrod Antoine de Baillet de Latour (général de division)
- Jean-Pierre Baillod (général de division)
- Antoine Raymond Baillot-Faral (général de brigade)
- François Gédéon Bailly de Monthion (général de division)
- Éloi Charles Balathier de Bragelonne (général de brigade)
- Antoine Balland (général de division)
- Basile Guy Marie Victor Baltus de Pouilly (général de division)
- Jean-Louis Bancal de Saint-Julien (général de brigade)
- Gilbert Jacques Bandy de Nalèche (général de brigade)
- Pierre Banel (général de brigade)
- Jean-François de Bar (général de brigade)
- Louis Baraguey d'Hilliers (général de division)
- Gilles Jean Marie Roland de Barazer, chevalier de Kermorvan (général de brigade)
- Joseph Barbanègre (général de brigade)
- Antoine Edme Adam de Barbazan (général de brigade)
- Jean-François Thérèse Barbier (général de brigade)
- Pierre Barbier (général de brigade)
- Marie Étienne de Barbot (général de division)
- Gabriel Barbou des Courières (général de division)
- Antoine Marie Bard (général de division)
- Jacques Bardenet (général de brigade)
- Martial Bardet de Maison-Rouge (général de division)
- Joseph David de Barquier (général de brigade)
- André Horace François de Barral de Rochechinard (général de brigade)
- Paul François Jean Nicolas de Barras (général de division)
- Jean Léonard Barrié (général de brigade)
- Pierre Barrois (général de division)
- Nicolas Barthel (général de division)
- Nicolas Martin Barthélemy (général de brigade)
- Antoine François Barthélemi de Bournet (général de brigade)
- François Barthélemy Beguinot (général de division)
- Jean-Étienne Barthier, baron de Saint-Hilaire (général de brigade)
- Nicolas-Denis de Bas de L'Aulne (général de brigade)
- Anne Charles Basset Montaigu (général de division)
- Pierre Baste (Contre-amiral and général de brigade)
- Louis Bastoul (général de brigade)
- Denis Battin (général de brigade)
- Auguste Nicolas Baudot (général de brigade)
- Pierre François Bauduin (général de brigade)
- Louis-Alexandre-Amélie de Bauduy de Bellevue (maréchal de camp)
- Jean-Baptiste Charles Baurot (général de brigade)
- François de Baussancourt (général de brigade)
- Armand Baville (général de brigade)
- Jean-Baptiste Lecat de Bazancourt (général de brigade).

=== Be ===
- Louis de Beaudiné de Romanet de Lestranges (général de brigade)
- Oliver Victor de Beaudre, ou de Baudre (général de brigade)
- Jean-Baptiste Beaufol (général de brigade)
- Louis Charles Antoine de Beaufranchet d'Ayat (général de brigade)
- Alexandre François Marie de Beauharnais (général de division)
- Eugène-Rose de Beauharnais, prince d'Eichstaedt, duc de Leuchtenberg, prince de Venise and Viceroy of Italy (général de brigade)
- Edme Henri de Beaujeu (général de brigade)
- Louis-Chrétien Carrière, Baron de Beaumont (général de division)
- Marc Antoine de Beaumont (général de division)
- Michel de Beaupuy (général de division)
- Pierre Raphaël Paillot de Beauregard (général de division)
- Louis Ferdinand Baillard de Beaurevoir (général de brigade)
- Louis-Jacques Beauvais (général de brigade)
- Charles Théodore Beauvais de Préau (général de brigade)
- Jean-Pierre Béchaud (général de brigade)
- Louis Samuel Albert Désiré Béchet de Léocour (général de division)
- Nicolas Joseph Bécourt (général de division)
- Jean-Pierre Bedos (général de brigade)
- Louis Paul de Beffroy (général de brigade)
- Jean Antoine Pierre de Béhague de Villeneuve (général de division)
- Nicolas Léonard Beker, comte de Mons (général de division)
- Alexandre Pierre Julienne de Bélair (général de division))
- Antoine Alexandre Julienne de Bélair (général de brigade)
- Jacques Belfort Renard (général de brigade)
- Claude-Henri Belgrand de Vaubois (général de division)
- Jacques Nicolas Bellavène (général de division)
- André de Bellefonte (général de brigade)
- Augustin Daniel Belliard (général de division)
- Louis Henri Charles de Bellon de Sainte-Marguerite (général de brigade)
- David Victor Belly de Bussy (général de brigade)
- François de Briançon de Vachon de Belmont, marquis de Belmont (général de division)
- Sigismond-Frédéric de Berckheim (général de division)
- François Berge (général de brigade)
- Pierre André Hercule Berlier (général de brigade)
- Jean-Baptiste Jules Bernadotte, prince de Pontecorvo (Maréchal d'Empire)
- Jacques Bernard Bernard (général de brigade)
- Simon Bernard (général de division)
- Benoît Guérin de Berneron (général de brigade)
- Jean-François Berruyer (général de division)
- Pierre Marie-Auguste Berruyer (général de brigade)
- Jacques Berthault (général de brigade)
- Étienne Ambroise Berthellemy (général de brigade)
- Pierre Augustin Berthemy (Maréchal de camp)
- Pierre Berthezène (général de division)
- Louis-Alexandre Berthier, prince de Neuchâtel et de Wagram (Maréchal d'Empire)
- Victor Léopold Berthier (général de division)
- Louis César Gabriel Berthier de Berluy (général de division)
- Nicolas Bertin (général de brigade)
- Antoine Marc Augustin Bertoletti (général de brigade)
- Jean-Baptiste Bertolosi (général de brigade)
- Antoine Joseph Bertrand (général de brigade)
- Edme Victor Bertrand (général de brigade)
- Henri Gratien Bertrand (général de division)
- Louis Bertrand de Sivray (général de brigade)
- Antoine Anne Lecourt de Béru (général de division)
- Martial Besse (général de brigade)
- Jean-Baptiste Bessières, duc d'Istrie (Maréchal d'Empire)
- Bertrand Bessières (général de division)
- François Bessières (général de division)
- Jacques de Besson, baron d'Ormeschwiller (général de brigade)
- Jean Alexis Béteille (général de brigade)
- Antoine de Béthencourt (général de brigade)
- Georges Emmanuel Beuret (général de division)
- Frédéric Auguste de Beurmann (général de brigade)
- Jean Ernest de Beurmann (général de brigade)
- Pierre Riel de Beurnonville (Maréchal de France)
- Claude de Beylié (général de brigade)
- Martial Beyrand (général de brigade)
- Jean Romain Conilh de Beyssac (général de brigade)
- Jean Michel Beysser (général de brigade).

=== Bi ===
- Pierre Marie de Bicquilley (général de brigade)
- Jacques Bidoit (général de brigade)
- Auguste Julien Bigarré (général de division)
- Louis de Bigault de Signemont (maréchal de camp)
- Pierre Joseph Billard (général de division)
- Pierre-Louis Binet de Marcognet (général de division)
- Louis François Binot (général de brigade)
- Baptiste Pierre François Jean Gaspard Bisson (général de division)
- Guilin Laurent Bizanet (général de division).

=== Bl ===
- Claude Marie-Joseph Blanc (général de brigade)
- Jean-Jacques Blanc (général de brigade)
- Amable Guy Blancard (général de brigade)
- Charles Étienne Guillaume Blandin de Chalain (général de brigade)
- Marie Pierre Isidore de Blanmont (général de brigade)
- Ange François Blein (général de brigade)
- Jacques Blondeau (général de brigade)
- Antoine François Raymond Blondeau du Fays (général de brigade)
- Louis Blosse (général de brigade)
- Pierre Louis de Blottefière (général de brigade)
- Jean-Antoine de Blou de Chadenac (général de division).

=== Bo ===
- Pierre Bodelin (général de brigade)
- Jean David Boerner (général de brigade)
- Jean Boillaud (général de brigade)
- Jean-Joseph Lamy de Boisconteau (général de brigade)
- Gilles Dominique Jean Marie de Boisgelin de Kerdu (général de brigade)
- Anne Marie François Barbuat de Maison-Rouge de Boisgérard (général de brigade)
- Jacques François Barbuat de Maison-Rouge de Boisgérard (général de brigade)
- Aurèle Jean de Boisserolle-Boisvilliers (général de brigade))
- Joseph-Valérian de Boisset (général de brigade)
- Henri Louis Augustin de Boissieu (général de brigade)
- Louis Régis de Boissy de Bannes (général de brigade)
- Jacques Denis Boivin (général de brigade)
- Guillaume Boivin de la Martiniére (général de brigade)
- François Charles Robert Chonet de Bollemont (général de division)
- Louis André Bon (général de division)
- Christophe Bon d'Estournelles (général de brigade)
- Jérôme Bonaparte (général de division)
- Joseph Bonaparte (général de division)
- Louis Bonaparte (général de division)
- Napoléon Bonaparte (général de division) (Emperor of the Empire)
- Raymond-Gaspard de Bonardi de Saint-Sulpice (général de division)
- Jean Pierre François Bonet (général de division)
- Jean-François Marie de Bongard ou Bongars (général de brigade)
- Jean-Baptiste Bonnafoux de Caminel (général de brigade)
- Jean-Gérard Bonnaire (général de brigade)
- Louis Bonnaire (général de division)
- Charles Bonnamy (général de brigade)
- Charles Robert André Bonnard (général de brigade)
- Ennemond Bonnard (général de division)
- Jacques Philippe Bonnaud (général de division)
- Jacques Bonnay de Troisfontaines (général de brigade)
- Pierre Bonnemains (général de division)
- Alexandre François Séraphin Bonnet (général de brigade)
- François Antoine Bonnet (général de brigade)
- Joseph Alphonse Hyacinthe Alexandre de Bonnet d'Honnières (général de brigade)
- Michel Louis Joseph Bonté, Baron de St Goazec (général de division)
- François Bontemps (général de brigade)
- Charles de Bonvoust (général de brigade)
- François Bony (général de brigade)
- Étienne Tardif de Pommeroux de Bordesoulle, comte de Bordessoulle (général de division)
- Camille Borghèse, Prince of Sulmona and of Rossano, Duke and Prince of Gustalla (général de division)
- François Borghèse (général de brigade)
- Pierre Honoré Bories de Castelpers (général de brigade)
- Jean-Baptiste Joseph Noël Borrel (général de brigade)
- Charles Luc Paulin Clément Borrelli (général de division)
- Jacques Marie Botot-Dumesnil (général de brigade)
- Pierre-Paul Botta (général de brigade)
- Alexandre François Joseph de Boubers-Mazingan (général de brigade)
- Jean-François Bouchel Merenveüe (général de division)
- Benoît-Louis Bouchet (général de division)
- François Louis Bouchu (général de division)
- Jean-Pierre Boucret (général de division)
- Jean Boudet (général de division)
- François Louis Boudin de Roville (général de brigade)
- Jacques Jean-Marie François Boudin, comte de Tromelin (général de division)
- Jean-Claude Boudinhon-Valdec (général de brigade)
- Louis de Bouillé (général de division)
- Jean Fortuné Boüin de Marigny (général de brigade)
- Servais Beaudouin Boulanger (général de brigade)
- Henri François Maurille de Boulard (général de brigade)
- Jean-François Boulart (général de brigade)
- Louis Jacques François Boulnois (général de division)
- François Antoine Louis Bourcier (général de division)
- Edme Martin Bourdois de Champfort (général de brigade)
- Jérôme-Dominique Bourgeat (général de brigade)
- Charles-François Bourgeois (général de brigade)
- Louis-Auguste-Victor, Count de Ghaisnes de Bourmont, (général de brigade)
- Jean Raymond Charles Bourke (général de division)
- Jean-Baptiste Boussard (général de brigade)
- André Joseph Boussart (général de division)
- Gilbert Boutarel de Langerolle (général de brigade)
- Jean-Philippe Boutteaux (général de brigade)
- Jean Louis Éloi Bouvard (général de brigade)
- Joseph Bouvier des Éclaz (général de brigade)
- Louis François Boy (général de brigade)
- Jacques Boyé (général de brigade)
- Charles Joseph Boyé, baron d'Abaumont (général de brigade)
- Louis Léger Boyeldieu (général de division)
- Henri Jacques Jean Boyer (général de brigade)
- Jean-Baptiste Nicolas Henri Boyer (général de brigade)
- Joseph Boyer (général de brigade)
- Pierre François Xavier Boyer (général de division)
- Joseph Boyer de Rébeval (général de division).

=== Br ===
- Michel Silvestre Brayer (général de division)
- Joseph Breissand (général de brigade)
- Antoine François Brenier-Montmorand (général de division)
- Jean-Pierre Alexandre Bresson de Valmabelle (général de brigade)
- Jean-Baptiste Breton (général de brigade)
- Louis-Adrien Brice De Montigny (général de division)
- André Louis Elisabeth Marie Briche (général de division)
- Louis Hercule Timoléon de Cossé, duc de Brissac (général de division)
- Hugues Brisset de Montbrun de Pomarède (général de brigade)
- Victor-François de Broglie (général de brigade)
- André François Bron de Bailly (général de brigade)
- Nicolas Bronikowski, comte d'Oppeln (général de division)
- Étienne Brouard (général de brigade)
- Jean-Baptiste Broussier (général de division)
- David Hendrikius Bruce (général de brigade)
- Jean Pierre Joseph Bruguière (général de division)
- Nicolas Brulé (général de brigade)
- Claude Louis Brun (général de brigade)
- Jacques François Brun (général de brigade)
- Jean Antoine Brun (général de brigade)
- Louis Bertrand Pierre Brun de Villeret (général de division)
- Guillaume Marie-Anne Brune (Maréchal d'Empire)
- Gaspard Jean-Baptiste Brunet (général de division)
- Jean-Baptiste Brunet (général de division)
- Vivant-Jean Brunet-Denon (général de brigade)
- Gilles Joseph Martin Bruneteau (général de division)
- Jean-Chrysostôme Bruneteau de Sainte-Suzanne, (général de brigade)
- François-Xavier Bruno (général de brigade)
- Adrien François de Bruno (général de brigade)
- Jean-Baptiste Bruny (général de brigade)
- Christophe Joseph de Brusselles (général de brigade)
- Nicolas Ernault de Rignac Des Bruslys (général de division).

=== Bu ===
- Jacques Bonaventure Buchet (général de brigade)
- Charles André Buchold (général de brigade)
- Claude Joseph Buget (général de division)
- Charles Joseph Buquet (général de brigade)
- Louis Léopold Buquet (général de brigade)
- Pierre Auguste François de Burcy (général de brigade)
- André Burthe (général de brigade)
- Jacques Butraud (général de brigade).

== C ==
=== Ca ===
- Marc Cabanes de Puymisson (général de brigade)
- Jean-Baptiste Cacault (général de brigade)
- Louis Marie Joseph Maximilien de Caffarelli du Falga (général de brigade)
- Marie-François Auguste de Caffarelli du Falga (général de division)
- Jean Alexandre Caffin (général de brigade)
- Jean-Jacques Caillet (général de brigade)
- Hubert Callier, baron de Saint-Apollin (général de division)
- François René Cailloux (général de brigade)
- Étienne Nicolas de Calon (général de brigade)
- André Carvin (général de brigade)
- Jean-Pierre-Hugues Cambacérès (général de brigade)
- Alexis Aimé Pierre Cambray (général de division)
- Pierre Jacques Étienne Cambronne (général de brigade)
- Isaac Jacques Delart Campagnol (général de brigade)
- François Frédéric Campana (général de brigade)
- Toussaint Campi (général de division)
- Jacques David Martin de Campredon (général de division)
- Louis-Auguste Camus (général de brigade)
- Christian François Camus, baron de Richemont (général de brigade)
- Jean Lecamus, baron de Moulignon (général de brigade)
- Louis Camus (général de brigade)
- Jean Baptiste Camille de Canclaux (général de division)
- Jacques Lazare Savettier de Candras, baron de La Tour de Pré (général de brigade)
- Samuel Canier (général de brigade) (Irlande)
- Charles de Canolles de Lescours (général de brigade)
- Simon Canuel (général de division)
- Claude Antoine Capon de Château-Thierry (général de brigade)
- Joseph Carcome-Lobo (général de division)
- Bernard Augustin Cardenau (général de brigade)
- Jean Pascal Raymond Carlenc (général de division)
- Jacques de Carles (général de division)
- Claude Marie Carnot de Feulins (général de division)
- Lazare Nicolas Marguerite Carnot (général de division)
- Antoine Jean Henri de Carové (général de brigade)
- François Carpantier (général de brigade)
- Claude Carra de Saint-Cyr (général de division)
- Joseph Emmanuel Laurrans du Carrel de Charly (général de brigade)
- Jean Augustin Carrié de Boissy (général de brigade)
- Louis-Anthelme Carrier (général de brigade)
- Louis Chrétien Carrière (général de division)
- Martin Jean François de Carrion de Loscondes (général de brigade)
- Jean-François Carteaux (général de division)
- Antoine Bénédict Carteret (général de division)
- Jean-Baptiste Jacques Cartier (général de brigade)
- Joseph Marie de Casabianca (général de division)
- Raphaël de Casabianca (général de division)
- Antoine Philippe Darius Casalta (général de brigade)
- Louis Victorin Cassagne (général de division)
- Pierre Cassagne (général de brigade)
- Louis Pierre Jean Aphrodise Cassan (général de brigade)
- Jean Castelbert de Castelverd (général de division)
- Nicolas Antoine Xavier Castella de Berlens (général de brigade)
- Pierre François Gilbert Castella (général de brigade)
- Simon Nicolas Constantin de Castella de Montagny (général de brigade)
- Boniface Louis André de Castellane (général de division)
- Bertrand Pierre Castex (général de division)
- Joseph Léon Cathelan (général de brigade)
- Bernard Louis Cattaneo (général de division)
- Armand Augustin Louis de Caulaincourt, duc de Vicence (général de division)
- Auguste Jean-Gabriel de Caulaincourt (général de division)
- Gabriel Louis de Caulaincourt (général de division)
- Jean-Jacques Causse (général de brigade)
- Pierre-Jean de Caux de Blacquetot (général de brigade)
- Jean-Baptiste de Caux de Blacquetot (général de division)
- Louis-Victor de Caux de Blacquetot (général de brigade)
- Jacques Marie Cavaignac (général de division)
- Jean-Baptiste Alexandre Cavrois (général de brigade)
- Louis-Joseph Cavrois (général de brigade)
- Louis-Joseph Elisabeth Cazals (général de brigade).

=== Ce-Ch ===
- Jean-Baptiste Cervoni (général de division)
- Gaspard Chabert (général de brigade)
- Pierre Chabert (général de brigade)
- Théodore Chabert (général de division)
- Louis François Jean Chabot (général de division)
- Joseph Chabran (général de division)
- Jacques Aimard de Moreton de Chabrillan (général de division)
- Jacques Henri Sébastien César de Moreton de Chabrillan (général de division)
- Pierre François Xavier Chaillet de Verges (général de brigade)
- Alexis Chalbos (général de division)
- Jacques-Antoine de Chambarlhac de Laubespin (général de division)
- Dominique-André de Chambarlhac (général de division)
- Pierre Joseph du Chambge d'Elbhecq, (général de division)
- François Chambon (général de brigade)
- Scipion Charles Victor Auguste de La Garde, marquis de Chambonas (général de brigade)
- Jean Marie Hector Crottier, marquis de Chambonas de Peyrault (général de brigade)
- Louis Joseph Jean-Baptiste de la Boëssière, comte de Chambors (général de division)
- Claude Souchon de Chameron ou Chamron (général de brigade)
- Vital Joachim Chamorin (général de brigade)
- Pierre Clément de Champeaux (général de brigade)
- Jean Étienne Vachier Championnet (général de division)
- Marie Pierre Félix Chesnon de Champmorin (général de brigade)
- Gaspard Adrien Bonnet du Louvat de Champollon (général de division)
- David Maurice Champouliès de Barrau de Muratel (général de brigade)
- François d'Hillaire de Chamvert (général de brigade)
- Jean-Nestor de Chancel (général de division)
- Jean-Baptiste Victor Chanez (général de brigade)
- Antoine Chanlatte (général de brigade)
- Antoine Pierre Joseph Chapelle, marquis de Jumilhac (général de division)
- Jean-Antoine Chapsal (général de division)
- Antoine Chapt de Rastignac (général de brigade)
- René-Bernard Chapuy (général de brigade)
- Louis Charbonnier (général de division)
- Joseph Claude Marie Charbonnel, comte de Salès (général de division)
- Alexis Antoine Charlery (général de brigade)
- Étienne Charlet (général de division)
- Hugues Charlot (général de brigade)
- Jean-Baptiste Charnotet (général de brigade)
- Henri François Marie Charpentier (général de division)
- Joseph Charras (général de brigade)
- Jean-Louis Charrière (général de brigade)
- Charles-François Charton (général de brigade)
- Joachim Charton (général de brigade)
- Claude Louis Chartongne (général de brigade)
- Jean Hyacinthe Sébastien Chartrand (général de brigade)
- Louis Philippe, Duke of Chartres (lieutenant général)
- David Henri Chassé (général de division)
- François de Chasseloup-Laubat (général de division)
- Thomas Jean Chassereaux (général de brigade)
- Joachim Chastanier de Burac (général de brigade)
- Louis Pierre Aimé Chastel (général de division)
- Achille François du Chastellet (général de division)
- Armand Marie Jacques de Chastenet, marquis de Puységur, (général de brigade)
- Alexandre Paul Guérin de Châteauneuf-Randon, marquis de Joyeuse (général de division)
- Pierre Guillaume Chaudron-Roussau (général de brigade)
- François Pierre Alexandre Chauvel (général de brigade)
- Jacques Chazeau-Duteil (général de brigade)
- Jean-Pierre François de Chazot (général de division)
- Jean Chemineau (général de division)
- Louis Nicolas Hyacinthe Chérin (général de division)
- Dominique Prosper de Chermont (général de brigade)
- Jacques François Chevalier (général de brigade)
- Pierre Chevalier (général de brigade)
- Jean Armand Chevalleau de Boisragon (général de brigade)
- Augustin René Christophe de Chevigné (général de division)
- Józef Chłopicki baron (général de division)
- Pierre Ambroise François Choderlos de Laclos (général de brigade)
- Louis Antoine Choin de Montgay baron de Montchoisy (général de division)
- Antoine César de Choiseul Praslin (général de brigade)
- Claude Gabriel de Choisy (général de division)
- Jacques Robert Souslier, baron de Choisy (général de brigade)
- Louis-Claude Chouard (général de brigade)
- Guillaume Xavier Chrétien (général de brigade)
- Joseph Christiani (général de brigade)
- Jean-François Christophe (général de brigade)
- Nicolas-François Christophe (général de brigade).

=== Cl ===
- Michel Marie Claparède (général de division)
- Henri Jacques Guillaume Clarke (général de division)
- Bertrand Clausel (général de division, Maréchal de France)
- Pierre Clavel (général de brigade)
- Louis Clemencet (général de brigade)
- Claude Clément (général de brigade)
- Jacques-Valère Clément (général de brigade)
- François Marie Clément de La Roncière (général de division)
- Gabriel-Joseph Clément (général de brigade)
- Antoine-Marguerite Clerc (général de brigade)
- Augustin Clerveaux (général de brigade)
- Jean Christophe Louis Frédéric Ignace de Closen (général de brigade).

=== Co ===
- Jean-François Coayllet (général de brigade)
- Antoine Christophe Cochois (général de brigade)
- Louis Jacques de Coehorn (général de brigade)
- Charles Yves César Cyr du Coëtlosquet (général de division)
- Jean-Baptiste de La Rivière de Montreuil de Coincy (général de division)
- Jacques Colas (général de brigade)
- Claude Sylvestre Colaud (général de division)
- Louis Pierre Alphonse de Colbert (général de division)
- Auguste François-Marie de Colbert-Chabanais (général de brigade)
- Pierre David de Colbert-Chabanais (général de division)
- François Coliny (général de brigade)
- Jean Antoine de Collaert (général de brigade)
- Jean Théodore Colle (général de brigade)
- Georges Henri Victor Collot
- Jean Christophe Collin (général de division)
- Louis Léonard Antoine Joseph Gaspard Venance, marquis de Colli-Ricci (général de division)
- Georges Henri Victor Collot (général de brigade)
- Joseph Antoine Colomb (général de brigade)
- Pierre Colomb (général de brigade)
- Jean Antoine François Combelle (général de division)
- Jean-François Combez (général de brigade)
- Jacques Jean Stanislas Combis (général de brigade)
- Marc-Antoine Commaire (général de division)
- Jean André Commes (général de brigade)
- Jean Dominique Compans (général de division)
- Claude Antoine Compère (général de brigade)
- Louis Fursy Henri Compère (général de brigade)
- Jacques Marie Joseph Conigliano-Carenthal (général de brigade)
- Nicolas François Conroux, baron de Pépinville (général de division)
- Vincent Marie Constantini (général de brigade)
- Claude Louis Constant Esprit Juvénal Corbineau (général de brigade)
- Jean-Baptiste Juvénal Corbineau (général de division)
- Joseph Corda (général de division)
- Étienne Jean-François Cordellier-Delanoüe (général de division)
- André François Corderan (général de brigade)
- André-Philippe Corsin (général de division)
- Roch Joseph Laurent Hyacinthe Corte (général de brigade)
- Antoine Alexandre de Cosson (général de brigade)
- Justin Théodore Coucourt (général de brigade)
- Joseph Christophe Couin, baron de Grandchamp (général de brigade)
- Annet-Antoine Couloumy (général de brigade)
- Jean Guillaume de Courpon (général de brigade)
- Jean Antoine Adrien de Courten (général de brigade)
- Pierre Antoine Courtot (général de division)
- Elzéar Auguste Cousin de Dommartin (général de division)
- Guy Coustard de Saint-Lo (général de division)
- Anne Jacques François Cousteau de Labarrère (général de brigade)
- Louis François Coutard (général de division)
- Jacques Joseph Couture (général de brigade)
- Charles Auguste Creutzer (général de brigade)
- Jean Ignace Crevoisier (général de brigade)
- Félix François Dorothée de Balbes de Berton de Crillon (général de division)
- Louis Pierre Nolasque de Balbes de Berton de Crillon (général de division)
- Arnold Croiset (général de brigade)
- Joseph Crousat (général de brigade)
- Henri Crublier d'Opterre (général de brigade)
- Anne Emmanuel François Georges de Crussol d'Amboise (général de division)
- Nicolas Cugnot d'Aubigny (général de brigade)
- Jean Nicolas Curély (général de brigade)
- Philibert Jean-Baptiste François Curial (général de division)
- Jean-Baptiste Théodore Curto (général de division)
- Adam Philippe de Custine, baron de Sarreck (général de division).

== D ==
=== Da ===
- Jean Melchior Dabadie de Bernet (général de brigade)
- Herman Willem Daendels (général de division)
- Luc Siméon Auguste Dagobert de Fontenille (général de division)
- Nicolas Dahlmann (général de brigade)
- Jean-Baptiste Dalesme (général de division)
- Claude Dallemagne (général de division)
- Alexandre d'Alton (général de division)
- François-Étienne de Damas (général de division)
- Achille Pierre Henri Picot de Dampierre (général de brigade)
- Auguste Marie Henri Picot de Dampierre (général de division)
- Jean Danglars-Bassignac (général de brigade)
- Louis Danloup-Verdun (général de brigade)
- André Charles Emmanuel Danzel (général de brigade)
- Louis Gaspard Dard d'Espinay (général de brigade)
- Charles Ambroise Dardenne (général de brigade)
- Paul Louis Dargiot de La Ferrière (général de brigade)
- Jean Barthélemy Claude Toussaint Darmagnac (général de division)
- Jacques Darnaud (général de division)
- Jean Boniface Darnaud (général de brigade)
- Henri Pierre Darnaudat (général de brigade)
- Augustin Darricau (général de division)
- Jean-Lucq Darriule (général de division)
- Pierre Bruno Daru (intendant général)
- Michel Jean Paul Daudiès (général de brigade)
- Joseph Augustin Fournier (général de division)
- Marie-Guillaume Daumas (général de brigade)
- Pierre Daumesnil (général de division)
- Charles Daurier (général de division)
- Guillaume Dauture (général de brigade)
- Jean-Baptiste Davaine (général de brigade)
- Jean Antoine David (général de brigade)
- Jean Davin (général de brigade)
- Joseph-Guillaume Davisard (général de brigade)
- Louis Alexandre Edme François Davout (général de brigade)
- Louis Nicolas Davout, duc d'Auerstaedt, prince d'Eckmühl (Maréchal d'Empire)
- Jean-Jacques Dazemar (général de brigade)

=== De ===
- Auguste Jean-Baptiste Debelle (général de brigade)
- César Alexandre Debelle, baron de La Gachetière (général de brigade)
- Jean-François Joseph Debelle (général de division)
- Jean Louis Debilly (général de brigade)
- Armand Louis Debroc (général de brigade)
- Jean-Baptiste Debrun (général de division)
- Charles Mathieu Isidore Decaen (général de division)
- Nicolas Declaye (général de brigade)
- Pierre Decouz (général de division)
- Vincent Martel Deconchy (général de division)
- François Louis Dedon-Duclos (général de division)
- Jean-Marie Antoine Defrance (général de division)
- François Emmanuel Dehaies (général de division)
- Jean Antoine Dejean (général de brigade)
- Jean François Aimé Dejean (général de division)
- Pierre François Marie Auguste Dejean (général de division)
- Amable Henri Delaage (général de division)
- Henri-Pierre Delaage, baron de Saint-Cyr (général de brigade)
- Mathieu Delabassée (général de brigade)
- Henri François Delaborde (général de division)
- Charles-Henri Delacroix (général de brigade)
- Antoine Charles Bernard Delaitre (général de division)
- Alexandre Delalain (général de division)
- Charles Nicolas Adrien Delanney (général de brigade)
- Jean-Baptiste Gabriel Marie Emmanuel Delapointe (général de brigade)
- Jean-Baptiste Grégoire Delaroche (général de division)
- Louis Pierre François Delattre (général de division)
- Jacques Charles René Delaunay (général de division)
- Victor Joseph Delcambre, baron de Champvert (général de brigade)
- François-Joseph Augustin Delegorgue (général de brigade)
- Jean-Marie Noël Delisle de Falcon, vicomte de Saint-Geniès (général de division)
- Jean-Pierre Dellard (général de brigade)
- Antoine Guillaume Delmas (général de division)
- Jacques-Antoine-Adrien Delort (général de division)
- Marie Joseph Raymond Delort (général de division)
- Jean-François Delort de Gléon (général de brigade)
- Louis Pierre Delosme (général de division)
- Antoine Joseph Delpierre (général de brigade)
- Alexis Joseph Delzons (général de division)
- Marc Jean Demarçay (général de brigade)
- Denis Joseph Demauroy (général de brigade)
- Jean Dembarrère (général de division)
- Ludwik Mateusz Dembowski, baron (général de brigade)
- Joseph Laurent Demont (général de division)
- Joseph Marie Denayer (général de brigade)
- Georges Frédéric Dentzel (général de brigade)
- Louis Jean Depetit de La Salle (général de brigade)
- Jacques François Henri Deplanque (général de brigade)
- Charles François Deponthon (général de division)
- Albert François Deriot (général de division)
- Paul Ferdinand Stanislas Dermoncourt (général de brigade)
- Nicolas Roques (général de division)
- Pierre César Dery (général de brigade)
- Jean-Charles Desailly (général de brigade)
- Louis Charles Antoine Desaix (général de division)
- Sylvain François Desbordes (général de brigade)
- Charles François Desbureaux (général de division)
- Jacques Antoine Deschamps de la Varenne (général de brigade)
- Jacques Ollivier Desclozeaux (général de brigade)
- Jean-François Louis Picault Desdorides (général de brigade)
- Jacques Philippe Desemery (général de brigade)
- Nicolas Joseph Desenfans (général de brigade)
- Edme Étienne Borne Desfourneaux (général de division)
- Antoine Grange (général de brigade)
- François-Ganivet Desgraviers-Berthelot (général de brigade)
- Michel Vandebergues (général de brigade)
- Antoine Auguste Desherbiers de Létanduère (général de brigade)
- Jacques Desjardin (général de division)
- François Antoine Denoyé (général de division)
- Éloi Laurent Despeaux (général de division)
- Hyacinthe François Joseph Despinoy (général de division)
- Charles Joseph Paul Leyris Desponchès (général de brigade)
- Albert Victoire Despret (général de brigade)
- François Alexandre Desprez (général de division)
- Joseph Marie Dessaix (général de division)
- Victor Abel Dessalles (général de brigade)
- Jean-Louis Dessaubaz (général de brigade)
- Bernard Dessein (général de division)
- Jean Joseph Dessolles (général de division)
- Jean-Marie Eléonore Léopold Destabenrath (général de brigade)
- Jacques Zacharie Destaing (général de division)
- Anne Louis Claude Destutt comte de Tracy (général de brigade)
- Jean-Jacques Desvaux de Saint-Maurice (général de division)
- Louis-Charles Lenoir (général de brigade)
- Nicolas Philibert Desvernois (général de brigade)
- François Laquet (général de brigade)
- François Detrès (général de division)
- Louis Marie François Paul Devaulx (général de division)
- Marie Jean-Baptiste Urbain Devaux (général de brigade)
- Philippe Devaux de Vautray (général de brigade)
- Pierre Devaux (général de brigade)
- François-Joseph Deverchin (général de brigade)
- Laurent Deviau de Saint-Sauveur (général de brigade)
- Claude Germain Louis Devilliers (général de division)

=== Di ===
- Alexandre César Hilarion Esprit Dianous de La Perrotine (général de brigade)
- Antoine Claude Dièche (général de division)
- Rodolphe de Diesbach (général de brigade)
- Frédéric de Diesbach (général de brigade)
- Dominique Diettmann (général de division)
- Jean-Pierre Alexandre Dieudé (général de brigade)
- Alexandre, vicomte Digeon (général de division)
- Armand Joseph Henri Digeon (général de division)
- Antoine Digonet (général de brigade)
- Arthur de Dillon (général de brigade)
- Theobald de Dillon (général de brigade)

=== Do ===
- Guillaume Dode de La Brunerie (général de division)
- Jean-Pierre Doguereau (général de brigade)
- Jean Henri Dąbrowski (général de division)
- Jean-Baptiste Dommanget (général de brigade)
- Jean-Siméon Domon (général de division)
- Jean Donadieu (général de brigade)
- Gabriel Donnadieu (général de division)
- Frédéric Guillaume de Donop (général de brigade)
- François-Xavier Donzelot (général de division)
- François Amédée Doppet (général de division)
- Jacques Dorbay (général de division)
- Joseph Dornes (général de brigade)
- Jacques Louis Dornier (général de brigade)
- Jean Marie Pierre Dorsenne (général de division)
- Jean Philippe Raymond Dorsner (général de division)
- Jean-Jacques Dortoman (général de brigade)
- Pierre Doucet (général de brigade)
- Jean-Pierre Doumerc (général de division)
- Jean-François Dours (général de division)

=== Dr ===
- Jacques Marie Charles de Drouas de Boussey (général de brigade)
- François-Richer Drouet (général de brigade)
- Jean-Baptiste Drouet d'Erlon (Maréchal de France)
- Antoine Drouot (général de division)
- Louis Pierre Milcolombe Drummond, comte de Melfort (général de brigade)

=== Du ===
- Paul-Alexis Dubois (général de division)
- Edmond Louis Alexis Dubois de Crancé (général de division)
- Jacques Charles Dubois de Thimville (général de brigade)
- Adrien Jean-Baptiste Amable Ramond du Bosc, comte du Dutaillis (général de division)
- Louis Dubouquet (général de division)
- Marie Anne Jean Alexandre Dubreil (général de brigade)
- Jean-Louis Dubreton (général de division)
- Jean Nicolas Xavier Ducasse (général de brigade)
- Nicolas Joseph Ducellier (général de brigade)
- Nicolas Ducheyron (général de brigade)
- Pierre Alexis Duclaux (général de brigade)
- Nicolas Ducos (général de brigade)
- François Bertrand Dufour (général de brigade)
- François Marie Dufour (général de division)
- Georges Joseph Dufour (général de division)
- Simon Camille Dufresse (général de brigade)
- Eléonor Bernard Anne Christophe Zoa Dufriche, baron de Valazé (général de division)
- Jacques François Coquille (général de division)
- Louis François Auguste Mazel du Goulot (général de brigade)
- Charles François Joseph Dugua (général de division)
- Philibert Guillaume Duhesme (général de brigade)
- Charles François Duhoux (général de division)
- Jean Lambert Marchal, chevalier Dujard (général de brigade)
- Charles François Dulauloy, comte de Randon (général de division)
- Louis Étienne Dulong de Rosnay (général de division)
- Anne Joseph Dumas (général de brigade)
- Guillaume Mathieu Dumas de Saint-Marcel (général de brigade)
- Thomas-Alexandre Dumas (général de division)
- Jean Louis Dumas (général de brigade)
- Mathieu Dumas (général de division)
- Jean-Baptiste Dumonceau de Bergendael (général de division)
- Charles Dumoulin (général de brigade)
- Pierre Charles Dumoulin (général de brigade)
- Charles François Dumouriez (général de division)
- Pierre Dumoustier (général de division)
- Pierre Dumoutier (général de brigade)
- Martin François Dunesme (général de brigade)
- Pierre Louis Dupas (général de division)
- René Joseph Dupeyroux (général de brigade)
- Léonard Duphot (général de brigade)
- Pierre Antoine Dupont-Chaumont (général de division)
- Pierre Dupont de l'Étang (général de division)
- Jean Duppelin (général de brigade)
- Hyacinthe Roger Duprat (général de division)
- Jean Étienne Benoît Duprat (général de brigade)
- Claude-François Duprès (général de brigade)
- Dominique Martin Dupuy (général de brigade)
- François Victor Dupuy de Saint-Florent (général de brigade)
- Florent Joseph Duquesnoy (général de division)
- François Marie Durand (général de brigade)
- Michel Durand (général de brigade)
- Luc Joseph Jean Duranteau de Baune (général de brigade)
- Antoine Duret (général de brigade)
- Géraud Christophe Michel Duroc, duc de Frioul (général de division)
- Antoine Jean Auguste Henri Durosnel (général de division)
- Antoine Simon Durrieu (général de division)
- Pierre François Joseph Durutte (général de division)
- Gilbert Louis Robinet Duteil d'Ozane (général de division)
- François Dutertre (général de brigade)
- Étienne Marie Dutilh (général de brigade)
- Claude-Thomas Dutour de Noirfosse (général de brigade)
- Jacques Dutruy (général de division)
- Blaise Duval (général de division)
- François Raymond Duval (général de brigade)
- Alexis Jean Henri Duverger (général de division)
- Joseph Duverger (général de division)
- Bernard Étienne Marie Duvignau (général de brigade)
- Jean-Pierre Thomas Duvignau (général de brigade)
- Charles Siffrein d'Anselme Duvignot (général de brigade)

== E ==
- Gaspard Eberlé (général de brigade)
- Jean-Baptiste Eblé (général de division)
- Jean Georges Edighoffen (général de brigade)
- August Karl von und zu Egloffstein (généralmajor)
- Jean Marie Rodolphe Eickemeyer (général de brigade)
- François Henri d'Elbée de La Sablonnière (général de brigade)
- Jacob Job Elie (général de division)
- Balthazar Joseph Emond d'Esclevin (général de brigade)
- Georges Henri Eppler (général de brigade)
- Charles Louis d'Erlach de Jegenstorf (général de brigade)
- Jean Augustin Ernouf (général de division)
- François Ignace Ervoil d'Oyré (général de brigade)
- Charles Marie Robert d'Escorches de Sainte-Croix (général de brigade)
- Marie Louis Henri d'Escorches de Sainte-Croix, marquis de Sainte-Croix (général de brigade)
- Jacques Henri Esnard (général de brigade)
- Jean-Louis-Brigitte Espagne (général de division)
- Jean Jacques Pierre d'Esparbès de Lussan (général de division)
- Jean-Marc Espert de Bulach (général de brigade)
- Jean-Baptiste Espert de Latour (général de brigade)
- Pierre Espert de Sibra (général de brigade)
- Antoine Joseph Marie d'Espinassy de Fontanelle (général de brigade)
- Étienne Estève (général de brigade)
- Jean-Baptiste Estève de Latour (général de brigade)
- François-Joseph d'Estienne de Chaussegros, vicomte de Léry (général de brigade)
- Sixte d'Estko (général de brigade)
- Louis Marie d'Estourmel (général de division)
- Jean Skey Eustace (général de brigade)
- Louis Auguste Frédéric Evain (général de division)
- Charles Joseph Evers (général de division)
- Philippe Evrard de Longeville (général de brigade)
- Marie Scipion d'Exéa (général de brigade)
- Rémi Joseph Isidore Exelmans (général de division)

== F ==
=== Fa ===
- Gabriel Jean Fabre (général de division)
- Jean Fabre de La Martillière (général de division)
- Joseph Vincent Dominique Fabre (général de brigade)
- Gabriel Louis Sabas de Faivre (général de brigade)
- Philippe Casimir de Falk (général de division)
- Victor Claude Alexandre Fanneau de Lahorie (général de brigade)
- Pierre Joseph Farine du Creux (général de brigade)
- Marie François Étienne César de Faucher (général de brigade)
- Jean-Louis-François Fauconnet (général de division)
- François Claude Joachim Faultrier de l'Orme (général de division)
- Simon de Faultrier (général de brigade)
- Chrétien François Antoine Faure de Gière (général de brigade)
- Jean-Baptiste Favart (général de brigade)
- Nicolas Remi Favart d'Herbigny (général de division)
- Charles François Léger Favereau (général de division)
- Jean Dominique Favereau (général de division)

=== Fe ===
- Dominique François Xavier Félix (général de brigade)
- Claude François Ferey baron de Rosengath (général de division)
- Pierre Marie Bartholomé Férino (général de division)
- François Fériol (général de brigade)
- Jean Louis Joseph César de Fernig (général de brigade)
- Jacques Ferrand (général de division)
- Jean Henri Becays Ferrand (général de division)
- Jean-Louis Ferrand (général de division)
- Gratien Ferrier (général de brigade)
- Pierre Joseph de Ferrier du Chatelet (général de division)
- Joseph Martin Madeleine Ferrière (général de brigade)
- Jean-Baptiste Michel Féry (général de brigade)

=== Fi ===
- Florentin Ficatier (général de brigade)
- Jean Edmond Filhol de Camas (général de brigade)
- Charles François Filon (général de brigade)
- Pascal Antoine Fiorella (général de division)
- Edmé Nicolas Fiteau, comte de Saint-Étienne (général de brigade)
- François Louis de Fitte, comte de Soucy (général de brigade).

=== Fl ===
- Auguste Charles Joseph de Flahaut de La Billarderie (général de division)
- Jean-François Flamand (général de brigade)

=== Fo ===
- Charles François Monin de Folenay (général de brigade)
- François-Xavier Octavie Fontaine (général de brigade)
- Jacques Fontane (général de division)
- Alexandre-Louis de Fontbonne (général de division)
- Jean-Marie Forest (général de brigade)
- François Louis Forestier (général de brigade)
- Gaspard François Forestier (général de brigade)
- Gaspard Hilarion Fornier d'Albe (général de brigade)
- Jacques Marguerite Étienne de Fornier (général de brigade)
- Dominique Casimir Fornier de Valaurie (général de brigade)
- Bruno Nicolas Foubert de Bizy (général de division)
- Louis François Foucher de Careil (général de division)
- Albert Louis Emmanuel de Fouler, comte de Relingue (général de division)
- Joseph Daultanne (général de division)
- Jean-Louis Fournier (général de division)
- François Fournier-Sarlovèze (général de division)
- François Fournier-Verrières (général de brigade)
- Maximilien Sébastien Foy (général de division)

=== Fr ===
- Jean-Louis de Franc d'Anglure (général de division)
- Jean-Baptiste Francesqui (général de brigade)
- Bernard-Georges-François Frère (général de division)
- François Antoine Freire-Pego (général de brigade)
- Maurice Ignace Fresia, baron d'Oglianico (général de division)
- Philibert Fressinet (général de division)
- André Bruno de Frévol de Lacoste (général de brigade)
- Gomez Freyre (général de division)
- François Xavier Jacob Freytag (général de division)
- Louis Friant (général de division)
- Jean Parfait Friederichs (général de division)
- Maurice Frimont (général de brigade)
- François Nicolas Fririon (général de division)
- Joseph François Fririon (général de brigade)
- Jean Froissard (general) (général de brigade)
- Jacques Pierre Fromentin (général de division)
- Jean Georges Fruhinsholz (général de brigade)
- Jean Urbain Fugière (général de brigade)
- Louis Auguste Fulcher de Monistrol (général de brigade)
- Henri de Fulque, comte d'Oraison (général de brigade)
- Pierre Fureau de Villemalet (général de division)
- Henri Guillaume de Furstemberg (général de brigade)
- Louis Fuzier (général de brigade)
- Jean Lambert Joseph Fyon (général de brigade)

== G ==
- Jean Edmé François Gachet de Sainte-Suzanne (général de brigade)
- François Thomas Galbaud-Dufort (général de brigade)
- Anne Jacques Jean Louis Galdemar (général de brigade)
- Antoine Pierre Gallois (général de brigade)
- Jean Hugues Gambin (général de brigade)
- Honoré Joseph Antoine Ganteaume (Amiral)
- Marie Théodore Urbain Garbé (général de division)
- Charles Mathieu Gardanne (général de brigade)
- Gaspard Amédée Gardanne (général de division)
- Jean Garderat (général de brigade)
- Louis Gareau (général de brigade)
- Pierre Dominique Garnier (général de division)
- Mathurin Gasnier (général de brigade)
- Joseph Gasquet (général de brigade)
- Jean-Jacques Basilien de Gassendi (général de brigade)
- Charles Louis Joseph de Gau de Fregeville (général de division)
- Jean-Henri-Guy-Nicolas de Frégeville, marquis de Grandval (général de division)
- Philibert Gaudet (général de brigade)
- Jean-Olivier Gaudin (général de brigade)
- Benjamin Gault, baron de Benneval (général de brigade)
- Paul Louis Gaultier de Kervéguen (général de division)
- Louis Marie Gaussart (général de brigade)
- Pierre Edmé Gautherin (général de division)
- Étienne Gauthier (général de brigade)
- Jean-Bernard Gauthier de Murnan (général de brigade)
- Jean-Joseph Gauthier (général de brigade)
- Jean-Pierre Gauthier (général de brigade)
- Nicolas Hyacinthe Gautier (général de brigade)
- André Marie Gautier de Montgeroult (général de brigade)
- Jean-Marie Gaspard Gauvilliers (général de division)
- Louis Gay (général de brigade)
- Louis Jean Gayault de Celon (général de brigade)
- Honoré Théodore Maxime Gazan de la Peyrière (général de division)
- Jean Michel Geither (général de brigade)
- Nicolas Louis Gelb (général de division)
- Louis Gelly (général de brigade)
- Claude Ursule Gency (général de division)
- Louis Thomas Gengoult (général de division)
- Alphonse Louis Gentil de Saint-Alphonse (général de division)
- Antoine Gentili (général de division)
- François-Joseph Gérard (général de division)
- Étienne Maurice Gérard (général de division)
- Jean-Charles Gerbous de La Grange (général de brigade)
- Maurice Gervais Joachim Geslin de Trémargat (général de brigade)
- Sébastien Charles Hubert de Gestas, marquis de Lespéroux (général de brigade)
- Gaspard Vincent Félix Giacomoni (général de division)
- André Gigaux (général de brigade)
- Jean-Philippe Gignious de Bernède (général de brigade)
- Jean Joseph Guillaume Marguerite Gilibert de Merlhiac (général de brigade)
- Jacques Laurent Gilly (général de division)
- Joseph Gilot (général de division)
- Pierre de Gimel de Tudeils (général de division)
- Jean-Baptiste Girard, duc de Ligny (général de division)
- Jean-Pierre Girard (général de brigade)
- Pierre Louis Pélagie Girard (général de brigade)
- Alexandre-Louis-Robert Girardin d'Ermenonville (général de division)
- Antoine Girardon (général de division)
- Jean-François Girardot (général de brigade)
- Antoine Giraud (général de brigade)
- Victor-Bonaventure Girod de Vienney (général de brigade)
- Jacques-Nicolas Gobert (général de division)
- Martin Charles Gobrecht (général de division)
- Roch Godart (général de brigade)
- Nicolas Godinot (général de division)
- Jean-Claude Goffard (général de brigade)
- Jacques Gilles Henri Goguet (général de division)
- Louis Antoine Vast Vite Goguet (général de brigade)
- Nicolas François Thérèse Gondallier de Tugny (général de brigade)
- Armand Louis de Gontaut-Biron (général de division)
- Jérôme Joseph Goris (général de brigade)
- François Claude Gosse (général de brigade)
- Jean-Florimond Gougelot (général de brigade)
- Cybard Florimond Gouguet (général de brigade)
- François Goullus (général de brigade)
- Louis Anne Marie Gouré de Villemontée, (général de brigade)
- Gaspard Gourgaud (général de division)
- Auguste Étienne Marie Gourlez, baron de Lamotte (général de division)
- Louis Jean-Baptiste Gouvion (général de division)
- Jean-Baptiste Gouvion (général de brigade)
- Laurent de Gouvion-Saint-Cyr (Maréchal d'Empire)
- Louis-Marthe de Gouy d'Arsy, marquis d'Arsy (général de brigade)
- Jean François Graindorge (général de brigade)
- Louis Joseph Grandeau, baron d'Abancourt (général de division)
- Charles Louis Dieudonné Grandjean (général de division)
- Balthazard Grandjean (général de brigade)
- Jean Sébastien Grandjean (général de brigade)
- Jean Grangeret (général de brigade)
- Charles Grangier de la Ferrière (général de brigade)
- François-Joseph de Gratet, vicomte du Bouchage (général de division)
- Pierre Guillaume Gratien (général de division)
- Pierre Marie de Grave (général de division)
- Jean Georges Grenier (général de brigade)
- Paul Grenier (général de division)
- François Joseph Fidèle Gressot (général de brigade)
- Pierre Joseph Bérardier Grézieu (général de brigade)
- Louis Grignon (général de brigade)
- Achille Claude Marie Tocip Grigny (général de brigade)
- Rémy Grillot (général de brigade)
- Nicolas Louis-Auguste de Grimoard de Beauvoir du Roure de Beaumont, comte de Brison (général de brigade)
- Philippe Henri de Grimoard (général de division)
- Pierre André Grobon (général de brigade)
- Joseph Groisne (général de brigade)
- Jean Gaston Quentin Gromard (général de division)
- Jean Louis Gros (général de brigade)
- Emmanuel de Grouchy, Marquis de Grouchy (Maréchal d'Empire)
- François Grouvel (général de division)
- Nicolas Gruardet (général de brigade)
- Louis Sébastien Grundler (général de division)
- Antoine Gruyer (général de brigade)
- Pierre César Gudin des Bardelières (général de division)
- Charles Étienne Gudin de la Sablonnière (général de division)
- Charles Louis Joseph Olivier Gueheneuc (général de division)
- Louis Charles de Guénand (général de brigade)
- François Guérin d'Etoquigny (général de division)
- Jacques Julien Guérin, baron de Wald Erbach (général de brigade)
- Nicolas Louis Guériot de Saint-Martin (général de brigade)
- Jean-Louis Charles Victor Guesnon-Deschamps (général de brigade)
- Pierre Gueydan (général de brigade)
- Emmanuel Maximilien-Joseph Guidal (général de brigade)
- Jean Joseph Guieu (général de division)
- Joseph Guillaume (général de brigade)
- Paul Guillaume (général de brigade)
- Frédéric François Guillaume de Vaudoncourt (général de brigade)
- Jean-Pierre Guillemet (général de brigade)
- Armand Charles Guilleminot (général de division)
- Pierre-Joseph Guillet (général de brigade)
- François Gilles Guillot (général de brigade)
- André Guinet (général de brigade)
- Nicolas Bernard Guiot de Lacour (général de division)
- Jean Guiot du Repaire (général de brigade)
- Georges Guiscard de Bar (général de brigade)
- Marie Adrien François Guiton (général de brigade)
- Michel Guy (général de brigade)
- Pierre Jules César Guyardet (général de brigade)
- Nicolas Philippe Guye (général de brigade)
- Claude Raymond Guyon (général de brigade)
- François Alexis Guyonneau de Pambour (général de brigade)
- Claude-Étienne Guyot (général de division)
- Étienne Guyot (général de brigade)

== H ==
- Pierre-Joseph Habert (général de division)
- Jean-Baptiste Charles Hallot (général de division)
- Christian Joseph Hammel (général de brigade)
- Antoine Alexandre Hanicque (général de division)
- François Hanriot (général de division)
- Honoré Alexandre Hacquin (général de division)
- Louis François Alexandre d'Harambure (général de division)
- Jean Hardy (général de division)
- Joseph Étienne Timoléon d'Hargenvilliers (général de brigade)
- Jean Isidore Harispe (maréchal de France)
- Louis Harlet (général de brigade)
- Olivier Harty, baron de Pierrebourg (général de division)
- Louis Auguste Juvénal des Ursins d'Harville (général de division)
- Étienne d'Hastrel de Rivedoux (général de division)
- Jacques Maurice Hatry (général de division)
- François Joseph Hauser (général de brigade)
- Jean-Joseph Ange d'Hautpoul (général de division)
- François Nicolas Benoît Haxo (général de division)
- Nicolas Haxo (général de brigade)
- Pierre Nicolas Joseph Hazard (général de brigade)
- Jean Hector dit Legros (général de brigade)
- Gabriel Marie Joseph Théodore d'Hédouville (général de division)
- François Nivard Charles Joseph d'Hénin (général de division)
- Jean-François Hennequin (général de brigade)
- Charles Nicolas Antoine d'Hennezel de Valleroy (général de brigade)
- Jean-François Henriod (général de brigade)
- Christophe Henrion (général de brigade)
- Jean-Pierre Henri (général de brigade)
- Jean-Baptiste Herbin-Dessaux (général de division)
- Mathieu Herbin (général de brigade)
- Pantaléon Charles François du Trousset comte d'Héricourt (général de brigade)
- Jean-Baptiste Michel René Durand, baron d'Herville (général de brigade)
- Charles de Hesse-Rheinfels-Rotenburg (général de division)
- Claude Marie Hervo (général de brigade)
- Étienne Heudelet de Bierre (général de division)
- Ghisbert Martin Cort Heyligers (général de division)
- Louis Maximilien François Herman Hinnisdal de Fumal (général de brigade)
- Louis Lazare Hoche (général de division)
- Jean Nicolas Houchard (général de division)
- César Louis Marie François Ange d'Houdetot (général de division)
- Léonard Jean Aubry Huard de Saint-Aubin (général de brigade)
- Pierre Antoine François Huber (général de division)
- Jean-Baptiste Michel Antoine Huché (général de division)
- Charles-Angelique-Francois Huchet de la Bedoyere (maréchal de camp France (1815))
- Claude François-Xavier Hue-Laborde (général de brigade)
- Édouard Huet (général de brigade)
- Louis Pierre Huet (général de division)
- Joseph Léopold Sigisbert Hugo (général de division)
- Louis Huguet-Chataux (général de brigade)
- Jacques Dominique Huin (général de brigade)
- Pierre-Augustin Hulin (général de division)
- Étienne Hulot (général de division)
- François Louis Humbert (général de brigade)
- Jean-François Sylvestre Humbert (général de brigade)
- Jean Joseph Amable Humbert (général de brigade)
- Jean Nicolas Humbert de Fercourt (général de brigade)
- Pierre Antoine Husson (général de division)

== I ==
- Jean Alexandre Ihler (général de division)
- Louis-Théobald Ihler (général de brigade)
- Sulpice Imbert de La Platière (général de brigade)
- Augustin Joseph Isambert (général de brigade)
- Charles Frédéric Louis Maurice, prince d'Isenbourg-Birstein (général de brigade)
- Pierre Ismert (général de brigade)

== J ==
- Władysław Franciszek Jabłonowski, (général de brigade)
- Maximilien Henri Nicolas Jacob (général de brigade)
- Philippe Joseph Jacob (général de division)
- Philippe Antoine Jacob de Cordemoy (général de brigade)
- Augustin Jean-Baptiste Jacobé de Trigny (général de brigade)
- Jean-Baptiste Jacopin (général de brigade)
- Nicolas Jacquemard (général de brigade)
- Jean-Pierre Jacquet (général de brigade)
- Jean-Baptiste Jacquin (général de brigade)
- Charles Claude Jacquinot (général de division)
- Pierre Jadart du Merbion (général de division)
- François Jalras (général de brigade)
- Jean-Baptiste Auguste Marie Jamin, marquis de Bermuy (général de brigade)
- Jean-Baptiste Jamin (général de division)
- Jacques Félix Jan de La Hamelinaye, comte de La Hamelinaye (général de division)
- Jan Willem Janssens (général de division)
- Henri-Antoine Jardon (général de brigade)
- Étienne Anatole Gédéon Jarry (général de brigade)
- François Jarry de Vrigny de La Villette (général de brigade)
- Arnail François, marquis de Jaucourt (général de division)
- Jacques Louis Jaucourt-Latour (général de brigade)
- Jean-Baptiste Jeanin (général de division)
- Louis François Jeannet (général de brigade)
- Jean-Louis Jenin (général de brigade)
- Charles Edward Jennings de Kilmaine (général de division)
- Dominique Joba (général de brigade)
- Étienne Joly (général de brigade)
- Thomas Joly (général de brigade)
- Jacques Jomard (général de brigade)
- Antoine-Henri de Jomini (général de brigade)
- Nicolas Louis Jordy (général de division)
- Jean-Louis Gaspard Josnet de Laviolais (général de brigade)
- Jacques Casimir Jouan (général de brigade)
- Barthélemy Catherine Joubert (général de division)
- Joseph Antoine René Joubert (général de brigade)
- Pierre Joseph Joubert de La Salette (général de brigade)
- Jean-Pierre de Jouffroy (général de brigade)
- Jean-Baptiste Jourdan (Maréchal d'Empire)
- Auguste Jubé de La Perelle (général de brigade)
- Joseph François Bénigne Julhien (général de brigade)
- Louis Joseph Victor Jullien de Bidon (général de division)
- Jean-Marie Jumel (général de brigade)
- Jean-Andoche Junot (général de division)
- Louis Charles de Jurgy de La Varenne (général de brigade)

== K ==
- Thomas Keating (général de division)
- François Christophe de Kellermann, duc de Valmy (Maréchal d'Empire)
- François Étienne de Kellermann (général de division)
- Jean-Jacques Kessel (général de brigade)
- Jean de Kindelan (général de division)
- François Joseph Kirgener, baron de Planta (général de division)
- Georges Kister, baron (général de brigade)
- Jean-Baptiste Kléber (général de division)
- Louis Klein (général de division)
- Stanislas Klicki, baron (général de brigade)
- Karol Kniaziewicz (général de brigade)
- Jean Konopka (général de brigade)
- Wincenty Krasiński comte Wincenty Korwin-Krasiński (général de division)
- Corneille Rodolphe Théodore Krayenhoff (général de brigade)
- Jean Ernest Kriegg (général de division)

== L ==
=== La ===
- Jean de Labadie (1719-1812) (général de brigade)
- André de La Barre (général de division)
- François Charles Labbé de Vouillers (général de brigade)
- François Garnier de Laboissière (général de brigade)
- Pierre Garnier de Laboissière (général de division)
- Anne François Augustin de La Bourdonnaye (général de division)
- André Adrien Joseph de La Bruyère (général de brigade)
- Étienne Chassin de La Bruyère (général de brigade)
- Jacques François Lachaise (général de brigade)
- Louis François Passerat de La Chapelle de Bellegarde (général de brigade)
- Claude Quentin de La Chiche (général de brigade)
- Jean-Pierre Lacombe-Saint-Michel (général de division)
- Jean Étienne Clément-Lacoste (général de brigade)
- Pierre Jean-Baptiste Lacoste de Fontenille (général de brigade)
- Jean Laurent Juslin de Lacoste-Duvivier (général de division)
- François Joseph Pamphile de Lacroix (général de division)
- Mathieu Lacroix (général de brigade)
- Jean-Gérard Lacuée, count of Cessac (général de division)
- Joseph Laczynski de Łada (général de brigade)
- Barthélémy-Simon-François de La Farelle (général de brigade)
- Marie Joseph Paul Roch Gilbert Motier, marquis de La Fayette (général en chef)
- Louis Marie Levesque de Laferrière (général de division)
- Justin Laffite (général de brigade)
- Michel Pascal Lafitte (général de brigade)
- André-Joseph Lafitte-Clavé (général de brigade)
- Guillaume Joseph Nicolas de Lafon-Blaniac (général de division)
- Elie Lafont (général de brigade)
- Jacques Mathurin Lafosse (général de brigade)
- Henri-Jacques Martin de Lagarde (général de brigade)
- Joseph Lagrange (général de division)
- Amédée Emmanuel François Laharpe (général de division)
- Armand Lebrun de La Houssaye (général de division)
- Louis Joseph Lahure (général de division)
- Frédéric Michel François Joseph de Lajolais (général de brigade)
- Charles Eugène de Lalaing d'Audenarde (général de division)
- Alexandre Lalance (général de brigade)
- Jean Lalanne (général de brigade)
- Charles Lallemand (général de division)
- Henri Dominique Lallemand (général de division)
- Joseph Théodore Gabriel Lallemand de Waites (général de brigade)
- François Joseph Drouot de Lamarche (général de division)
- Antoine Nicolas Collier de La Marlière (ou Lamarlière) (général de division)
- Jean-Baptiste Théodore Lamarque d'Arrouzat (général de brigade)
- Jean Maximilien Lamarque (général de division)
- Henri François Lambert (général de brigade)
- Urbain François Lambert (général de brigade)
- Charles Pierre de Lamer (général de division)
- Alexandre Théodore Victor de Lameth (général de division)
- Charles Malo de Lameth (général de brigade)
- Etienne François Rocbert de Lamorendière-Ducoudray (général de brigade)
- Louis Charles de La Motte-Ango de Flers, vicomte de Flers (général de division)
- Pierre François Lambert Lamoureux de la Gennetière (général de division)
- Jean-Baptiste Lamouroux de La Roque-Cusson (général de brigade)
- Louis Augustin Lamy d'Hangest (général de division)
- Charles François Joseph de Lamy (général de brigade)
- Jean-Joseph Lamy de Boisconteau (général de brigade)
- Jean Pierre Lanabère (général de brigade)
- Louis François Lanchantin (général de brigade)
- Charles Hyacinthe Leclerc de Landremont (général de division)
- Jean-Noël Landrin (général de division)
- Gaspard Louis Langeron (général de brigade)
- Denis Jean Florimond Langlois de Mautheville, marquis du Bouchet (général de division)
- Jean Lannes, duc de Montebello (Maréchal d'Empire)
- René Joseph de Lanoue (général de division)
- Marin Guéroult Lapalière (général de brigade)
- François Lanusse (général de division)
- Pierre Lanusse (général de division)
- Pierre Belon Lapisse baron de Sainte-Hélène (général de division)
- Jean-Baptiste Antoine Laplanche (général de brigade)
- Claude Joseph de Laplanche-Morthières (général de brigade)
- Jean Grégoire Barthélemy Rouger de Laplane (général de division)
- Jean François Cornu de La Poype (général de division)
- Pierre Laprun (général de division)
- Toussaint Joseph de Lardemelle (général de brigade)
- Jean Ambroise Baston de Lariboisière (général de division)
- François Laroche (général de brigade)
- Antoine Laroche-Dubouscat (général de division)
- François XII Alexandre Frédéric de La Rochefoucauld, duc d'Estissac et duc de Liancourt (général de division)
- Philippe Ambroise Denis Laronde (général de division)
- Jean Alexandre Durand de La Roque (général de division)
- Jean-Louis de La Roque (général de brigade)
- Jean Baptiste Larroque (général de brigade)
- Jean La Sabatie (général de brigade)
- Jean Jacques Bernardin Colaud de La Salcette (général de division)
- Antoine Charles Louis de Lasalle (général de division)
- Jean Charlemagne Maynier, comte de La Salle (général de brigade)
- François Lassalle-Cezeau (général de brigade)
- François de Lastic (général de division)
- Pierre François Lataye (général de brigade)
- Jean-Jacques de Laterrade (général de brigade)
- Antoine Henri Armand Jules Elisabeth de Latour-Foissac (général de division)
- François Philippe de Latour-Foissac (général de division)
- Henri Joseph Vincent Latour (général de brigade)
- Joseph Latour (général de brigade)
- Juste-Charles de Fay de La Tour-Maubourg (général de division)
- Victor de Fay de La Tour-Maubourg (général de division)
- Guillaume Latrille de Lorencez (général de division)
- Pierre Marie du Lau d'Allemans (général de division)
- Germain Félix Tennet de Laubadère (général de division)
- Joseph Marie Tennet de Laubadère (général de division)
- Louis-François-Bertrand du Pont d'Aubevoye de Lauberdière (général de division)
- Jean-Baptiste Lauer (général de brigade)
- Jean-Baptiste de Laumoy (général de brigade)
- Michel de Laumur (général de brigade)
- Jean Aulay de Launay (général de division)
- François Guillaume Barthélémy Laurent (général de division)
- Jacques Lauriston (maréchal de France)
- Anne Gilbert de Laval (général de division)
- Louis Jean Baptiste de Lavalette (général de brigade)
- Jean-Pierre Marie Lavalette du Verdier (général de brigade)
- Joseph Alexandre Félix Marie de Laville (général de brigade)
- Gaëtan Joseph Prosper César de Laville de Villa-Stellone (général de brigade)
- Ferdinand de La Ville-sur-Illon (général de brigade, Royaume de Westphalie)
- Joseph Félix de Lazowski (général de brigade)

=== Le ===
- Antoine Joseph Claude Le Bel (général de brigade)
- Paul Alexandre Leblanc-Delisle (général de brigade)
- Claude Marie Lebley (général de brigade)
- Louis Vincent Joseph Leblond, comte de Saint Hilaire (général de division)
- Léonard Lebondidier (général de brigade)
- Anne Charles Lebrun, duc de Plaisance (général de division)
- François Léon Lebrun (général de brigade)
- Jacques Lecapitaine (général de brigade)
- François-Joseph Lecat (général de brigade)
- Jean Léchelle (général de division)
- Joseph (Giuseppe) Lechi (général de division)
- Théodore François Joseph Leclaire (général de brigade)
- Louis Nicolas Marin Leclerc des Essarts (général de division)
- Pierre Leclerc d'Ostein (général de brigade)
- Charles Victoire Emmanuel Leclerc (général de division)
- Jean-Baptiste Sébastien Le Comte (général de brigade)
- René François Lecomte (général de brigade)
- Claude Jacques Lecourbe (général de division)
- Robert Antoine Marie Lecousturier, vicomte d'Armenonville (général de brigade)
- Joseph Thomas Ledée (général de brigade)
- Pierre Eléonore Le Dieu de Ville (général de brigade)
- Jean-Denis Le Doyen (général de brigade)
- François Roch Ledru des Essarts (général de division)
- François Joseph Lefebvre, duc de Dantzig (Maréchal d'Empire)
- Marie Xavier Joseph Lefebvre, comte de Dantzig (général de brigade)
- Simon Lefebvre (général de brigade)
- Jacques Henri François Lefebvre de Ladonchamp (général de brigade)
- Charles Lefebvre-Desnouettes (général de division)
- Louis Hyacinthe Le Feron (général de brigade)
- Étienne Nicolas Lefol (général de division)
- Charles Auguste Philippe Lefort (général de brigade)
- Frédéric Antoine Henri Lefort (général de brigade)
- Jacques Lefranc (général de brigade)
- François Marie Guillaume Legendre d'Harvesse (général de brigade)
- Pierre Joseph Légier (général de brigade)
- Pierre Léglise (général de brigade)
- Claude Juste Alexandre Legrand (général de division)
- Étienne Legrand, baron de Mercey (général de division)
- Louis Melchior Legrand (général de brigade)
- Maximin Legros (général de brigade)
- François-Joseph Leguay (général de brigade)
- François Leigonyer (général de brigade)
- Louis-François Lejeune (général de brigade)
- Adélaïde Blaise François Le Lièvre, marquis de La Grange et de Fourilles (général de division)
- Armand Charles Louis Le Lièvre de La Grange, comte de La Grange (général de division)
- André Joseph Lemaire (général de division)
- Jean Léonor François Le Marois (général de division)
- Louis Lemoine (général de division)
- Louis René Le Mouton de Boisdeffre (général de brigade)
- Marc-Antoine Lemoyne (général de brigade)
- Charles Philibert de Lenglentier (général de division)
- Auguste Nicolas Lenoir (général de brigade)
- Michel Étienne François Lenoir de La Cochetière (général de brigade)
- Henri Marie Lenoury (général de division)
- Joseph Placide Alexandre Léorier (général de brigade)
- Jean-François Lepaige (général de brigade)
- Guillaume Lepéduchelle (général de brigade)
- Louis Lepic (général de division)
- Pierre Henri Lepin (général de division)
- Joseph François Antoine Gabriel Lépine (général de brigade)
- Louis Lequoy (général de division)
- Albert Auguste Le Ris de La Chapelette (général de brigade)
- Gabriel Jacques Lerivint (général de brigade)
- Joseph Hervé Jean Le Roy de Préval (général de brigade)
- Charles Louis Joseph de L'Escuyer, marquis d'Hagnicourt (général de brigade)
- Georges Hippolyte Le Sénécal (général de brigade)
- Louis Jean-Baptiste Leseur (général de brigade)
- Augustin de Lespinasse (général de division)
- Claude Aimable Vincent de Roqueplant de L'Estrade (général de division)
- Joseph Mathurin Fidèle Lesuire, baron de Bizy (général de brigade)
- Henri Letellier (général de brigade)
- Louis Michel Letort (général de division)
- François-Joseph Alexandre Letourneur (général de brigade)
- François Louis Honoré Le Tourneur (général de brigade)
- Jean François Leval (général de division)
- Victor Levasseur, (général de brigade)
- Joachim Joseph Levasseur de Neuilly (général de brigade)
- Pierre Léon Levavasseur (général de division)
- Jean Pierre Baptiste L'Eveillé (général de brigade)
- Alexis Paul Michel Le Veneur de Tillières, comte d'Empire (général de division)
- Joseph Marie Levie (général de brigade)
- Joseph Placide Alexandre Levrier (général de division)

=== Lh - Li ===
- Pierre François Lhermitte d'Aubigny (général de brigade)
- Samuel-François Lhéritier (général de division)
- François Lhuillier de Hoff (général de division)
- Charles Antoine Liébault (général de brigade)
- Jean Jacques Liébert baron de Nitray (général de division)
- François Liégard (général de brigade)
- Louis Liger-Belair (général de division)
- René Charles Élisabeth de Ligniville (l'Arc indique Ligneville) (général de division)
- Jean Dieudonné Lion (général de division)
- Pierre Gaston Henri de Livron (général de brigade)

=== Lo ===
- Pierre-Charles Lochet (général de brigade)
- Odon Nicolas Loeillot Demars (général de brigade)
- Louis Henri Loison (général de division)
- Antoine de Sagne de Lombard (général de division)
- Louis Lonchamp (général de brigade)
- Jean-Baptiste de Lorcet (général de brigade)
- Jean Thomas Guillaume Lorge (général de division)
- Jean-Claude Loubat de Bohan (général de brigade)
- Nicolas de Loverdo (général de division)

=== Lu ===
- Tomasz Łubieński (général de brigade)
- Nicolas de Luckner (maréchal de France)
- Edme Aimé Lucotte (général de division)
- Denis-Éloi Ludot (général de brigade)
- Isidore Lynch (général de division)

== M ==
=== Ma ===
- Jacques MacDonald, duc de Tarente (Maréchal d'Empire)
- Pierre Macon (général de brigade)
- François Antoine Joseph Nicolas Macors (général de division)
- François Macquard (général de division)
- Alexis Magallon de la Morlière (général de division)
- François-Louis Magallon de la Morlière (général de division)
- Joseph Antoine Marie Michel Mainoni (général de brigade)
- Simon Hubert Maire (général de brigade)
- Nicolas Joseph Maison (Maréchal de France)
- Philippe Joseph Malbrancq (général de brigade)
- Claude François de Malet (général de brigade)
- Pierre Antoine Anselme Malet (général de brigade)
- Jean-Pierre Firmin Malher (général de division)
- Marc Antoine Malleret, baron de Verteuil de Malleret (général de division)
- François Théobald de Maltzan (général de brigade)
- Étienne Bernard Malye (général de brigade)
- Eugène Charles Auguste David de Mandeville (général de brigade)
- Jean-Baptiste Mangin-Doins (général de brigade)
- Charles Antoine Manhès (général de division)
- Joseph-Yves Manigault-Gaulois (général de brigade)
- Jean-Baptiste Félix de Manscourt du Rozoy (général de brigade)
- Jacques Charles de Manson (général de brigade)
- Jean-Pierre Maransin (général de division)
- Jean René Paul Blandine de Marassé (général de division)
- Jean-Antoine Marbot (général de division)
- Marcellin Marbot (général de brigade)
- Louis Henri François de Marcé (général de division)
- François-Séverin Marceau-Desgraviers (général de division)
- Edmé Pierre Louis Marchais (général de brigade)
- Jean Gabriel Marchand (général de division)
- Louis Thomas Marchant (général de brigade)
- Théodore Melchior Marchant (général de brigade)
- Mathieu Henri Marchant de La Houlière (général de division)
- Louis Marès (général de brigade)
- Armand Samuel de Marescot (général de division)
- Pierre Margaron (général de division)
- Jacques Philippe de Marguenat (général de brigade)
- Jean Joseph Marguet (général de brigade)
- Louis Auguste François Mariage (général de brigade)
- Jean-Baptiste Simon Etienne Marie, vicomte de Fréhaut (général de brigade)
- Jean Fortuné Boüin de Marigny (général de brigade)
- Jacques-Barthélémy Marin (général de brigade)
- Charles Stanislas Marion (général de brigade)
- Frédéric Christophe Henri Pierre Claude Vagnair (général de brigade)
- Auguste de Marmont, duc de Raguse (Maréchal d'Empire)
- Jacob François Marulaz (général de division)
- Philippe André Martel (général de brigade)
- Charles Pascalis de Martignac (général de division)
- Pierre Martillière (général de brigade)
- Joseph Magdelaine Martin (général de brigade)
- Georges Alexandre Martuschewitz de Labedz (général de brigade)
- Ferdinand Daniel Marx (général de brigade)
- Jean-Baptiste Charles René Joseph du Mas de Polart (général de division)
- André Masséna, duc de Rivoli, prince d'Essling (Maréchal d'Empire)
- Jean de Massia (général de brigade)
- Honoré Louis Auguste Massol de Monteil (général de division)
- Jean Augustin Masson (général de brigade)
- Pierre Mataly de Maran, (général de brigade)
- Joseph Matenot (général de brigade)
- Jean-Baptiste Martial Materre (général de brigade)
- Jean Nicolas Éloi Mathis (général de brigade)
- Jean Mauco (général de division)
- Jean-François Nicolas Joseph Maucomble (général de brigade)
- Pierre Adrien de Maudet (général de division)
- Antoine Maugras (général de brigade)
- Emmanuel Gabriel de Maulde (général de brigade)
- François Maulmond (général de brigade)
- Pierre Honoré Anne Maupetit (général de brigade)
- Louis Joseph Maupoint, baron de Vandeul (général de brigade)
- Anne-Joseph-Hippolyte de Maurès de Malartic, comte de Malartic (général de division)
- Nicolas Maurice (général de brigade)
- Antoine Maurin (général de division)
- Denis Joseph De Mauroy (général de brigade)
- Henry Maury (général de brigade)
- Jean Adam Mayer (général de brigade)
- Joseph Sébastien Mayer (général de brigade)
- Étienne Maynaud de Bizefranc de Laveaux (général de division)

=== Me ===
- Charles Marc Louis de Mellet (général de brigade)
- Antoine Menant (général de brigade)
- Philippe Romain Ménard (général de division)
- Jean-François Xavier de Ménard (général de division)
- François Xavier de Mengaud (général de division)
- Jean-Baptiste Pierre Menne (général de division)
- Jacques-François Menou, baron de Boussay (général de division)
- Charles-Nicolas Méquillet (général de division)
- Jean Nicolas Méquillet (général de division)
- Pierre Hugues Victoire Merle (général de division)
- Pierre Nicolas Merle-Beaulieu (général de brigade)
- Christophe Antoine Merlin (général de division)
- Antoine François Eugène Merlin (général de division)
- Jean-Baptiste Gabriel Merlin (général de brigade)
- Julien Augustin Joseph Mermet (général de division)
- Antoine Mermet de Saint-Landry (général de brigade)
- Jean Mesclop (général de brigade)
- Jacques Mesnage (général de brigade)
- Benoît Meunier, baron de Saint-Clair (général de division)
- Claude Marie Meunier (général de division)
- Hugues Alexandre Joseph Meunier (général de division)
- Hugues Meunier (général de brigade)
- Jean-Baptiste Marie Meusnier de la Place (général de division)
- Charles-Claude Meuziau (général de division)
- Pierre Arnould Meyer (général de division)
- Jean-Baptiste Maur Ange Montanus Joseph Rodolphe Eugène Meyer (général de brigade)
- Bernard Meinrad Frédalin Joseph Philippe Nérée Jean-Baptiste Meyer de Schauensée (général de brigade)
- Louis Henri René Meynadier (général de division)
- Jean-Baptiste Meynier (général de division)

=== Mi ===
- Joseph de Miaczynski (général de brigade)
- Jean-François Micas (général de division)
- Claude Ignace François Michaud (général de division)
- Jean Le Michaud d'Arçon
- Pierre Antoine Michaud (général de division)
- Antoine Michaux (général de brigade)
- Claude-Étienne Michel (général de division)
- Jean-Baptiste Pierre Michel (général de brigade)
- Jean Bernard Michel de Bellecour (général de division)
- Jean Quirin de Mieszkowski (général de brigade)
- Thomas Mignot, baron de Lamartinière (général de division)
- Joseph Mignotte (général de brigade)
- Jacques Louis François Milet (général de brigade)
- Louis Marie Antoine Milet de Mureau, baron de Destouff (général de division)
- Jean-Antoine Leclerc de Milfort (général de brigade)
- Édouard Jean Baptiste Milhaud (général de division)
- Théodore François Millet (général de brigade)
- Armand Louis Amélie Millet de Villeneuve (général de division)
- Jean-Michel Alexandre de Millo (général de brigade)
- Jean-Louis Toussaint Minot (général de brigade)
- Balthazar de Miollis (général de brigade)
- Sextius Alexandre François de Miollis (général de division)
- Pierre André Miquel (général de brigade)
- Guillaume Mirabel (général de brigade)
- Francisco de Miranda (général de division)
- Antoine René de Mirondel (général de brigade)
- François Mireur (général de brigade)

=== Mo ===
- Georges Alexis Mocquery (général de division)
- Jean-Baptiste Molette, baron de Morangiès (général de brigade)
- Gabriel Jean Joseph Molitor, (Maréchal de France)
- Jean Nicolas de Monard (général de brigade)
- Bon-Adrien Jeannot de Moncey, duc de Conegliano (Maréchal d'Empire)
- Georges Monet (général de brigade)
- John Money (général de brigade)
- François Bernard de Mongenet (général de brigade)
- André Monleau (général de brigade)
- Louis Claude Monnet de Lorbeau (général de division)
- Jean-Charles Monnier (général de division)
- René Nicolas Monnier (général de division)
- Marie Pierre Hypolithe Monnyer de Prilly (général de brigade)
- Joseph Monroux (général de brigade)
- Marc-René de Montalembert (général de division)
- Alexandre de Montbrun (général de brigade)
- Louis-Pierre Montbrun (général de division)
- Gabriel Gaspard Achille Adolphe Bernon de Montélégier (général de brigade)
- Jean Étienne François Monter (général de brigade)
- Anne Pierre de Montesquiou, marquis de Montesquiou-Fézensac (général de division)
- Raymond Aymeric Philippe Joseph de Montesquiou, duc de Montesquiou-Fézensac (général de division)
- Philippe André François de Montesquiou-Marsan, comte de Montesquiou-Fézensac (général de division)
- Jean Montfalcon (général de division)
- Jacques de Montfort (général de brigade)
- Charles Tristan de Montholon-Sémonville (général de brigade)
- Louis-Adrien Brice De Montigny (général de division)
- Mathieu Paul Louis de Montmorency-Laval, vicomte de Laval (général de brigade)
- Joseph Louis François Hyacinthe de Montredon (général de division)
- Charles Antoine Morand (général de division)
- Joseph Morand (général de division)
- Pierre Morand du Puch aîné chevalier de Grangeneuve (général de division)
- Pierre Morand du Puch cadet, chevalier Morand du Puch et de l'Empire (général de brigade)
- Charles Morard de La Bayette de Galles (général de division)
- Jean-Claude Moreau (général de brigade)
- Jean Victor Marie Moreau (général de division)
- Jean René Moreaux (général de division)
- Denis Jacques de Moret seigneur du Jalet (général de brigade)
- Jacques Aimard de Moreton de Chabrillant (général de division)
- Jacques Henri Sébastien César Moreton Chabrillant (maréchal de camp)
- Joseph Dominique de Chabrillan (général de brigade)
- Jacques-Polycarpe Morgan (général de division)
- Jean-Baptiste Louis Morin (général de brigade)
- Pierre-Nicolas Morin (général de brigade)
- Annet Morio de L'Isle (général de brigade)
- Joseph Antoine Morio de Marienborn (général de division)
- Antoine Morlot (général de division)
- Ange-Pierre Moroni (général de brigade)
- Édouard Mortier, duc de Trévise (Maréchal d'Empire)
- Jean-Louis Olivier Mossel (général de division)
- Robert Motte (général de brigade)
- Jean-Baptiste Moulin (général de brigade)
- Jean-François Moulin (général de division)
- André Mouret (général de division)
- Pierre Mourier (général de brigade)
- Barthélémy François Mousin (général de division)
- Georges Mouton, comte de Lobau (général de division)
- Régis Barthélemy Mouton-Duvernet (général de division)
- Jacques Nicolas Moynat d'Auxon (général de brigade)

=== Mu ===
- François Muller (général de division)
- Jacques Léonard Muller (général de division)
- Louis Dominique Munnier (général de division)
- Joachim Murat, Grand Duke of Berg and Clèves, King of Naples (Maréchal d'Empire)
- David Maurice de Barreau-Champoulies de Muratel (général de brigade)
- Jean-Bernard Gauthier de Murnan (général de brigade)
- Benoît Pierre Charles de Musino, comte du Hamel (général de division)
- Louis François Félix Musnier (général de division)
- Jean-Charles Musquinet de Beaupré (général de brigade)
- Jean Baptiste de Félix du Muy, comte de Saint-Maime et du Muy, (général de division)
- Ernest Albert Henri de Lubicz-Mylius (général de brigade)

== N ==
- Henri Nadot-Fontenay (général de division)
- Thomas-Patrice Nagle (général de brigade)
- Étienne Marie Antoine Champion Nansouty (général de division)
- James Napper Tandy (général de brigade)
- Louis Marie Jacques Almaric de Narbonne Lara (général de division)
- Alexandre-Pierre Navelet de La Massonnière (général de brigade)
- Étienne Henri Christophe Nayrod (général de brigade)
- Gabriel Neigre (général de division)
- Pierre-Michel Nempde-Dupoyet (général de brigade)
- Emmanuel Michel Bertrand Gaspard Neuhaus (général de division)
- Joachim Joseph Neuilly (général de brigade)
- Joseph Victorin Nevinger (général de division)
- Michel Ney, duc d'Elchingen, prince de la Moskova (Maréchal d'Empire)
- Jean Nicolas (général de brigade)
- Louis-Marie de Noailles (général de brigade)
- Pierre Noël (général de brigade)
- Antoine Noguès (général de brigade)
- Jean-François Xavier Noguès (général de division) frère du précédent;
- Jean-Baptiste Noirot (général de brigade)
- Jean-François Gaspard Normand (général de brigade)
- Henri Marie Lenoury (général de division)
- Jean-Baptiste Nouvion (général de brigade)
- Charles Joseph de Nozières d'Envezin, comte de Rosières (général de division)
- Léopold Anne-Marie Joseph de Nucé (général de brigade)

== O ==
- Marc Antoine Marie Obert (général de division)
- Arthur O'Connor (général de division)
- François-Joseph d'Offenstein (général de division (1793-1794) et général de brigade (1807-1816))
- Patrice O'Keeffe (général de brigade)
- André Louis Olagnier (général de division)
- Jean-Baptiste Olivié (général de division)
- Guillaume O'Meara (général de brigade)
- Thomas O'Meara, comte de Baane (général de brigade)
- Jacques O'Moran (général de division)
- Jean O'Neill (général de brigade)
- Louis Joseph Opsomer (général de brigade)
- Michel Ordener (général de division)
- Alexandre Ordioni (général de brigade)
- Louis Ordonneau (général de division)
- Philippe-Égalité, duc d'Orléans (général de division)
- Louis-Philippe d'Orléans (général de division)
- François Léon Ormancey (général de brigade)
- Jean Jacques de La Roque d'Olès d'Ornac (général de division)
- Philippe Antoine d'Ornano
- Eugène François Orsatelli (général de brigade)
- Jean-François Louis Marie Albert Grimod d'Orsay (général de division)
- David Ortlieb (général de brigade)
- Richard O'Shée (général de brigade)
- Christophe Ossvald (général de brigade)
- Pierre-Jacques Osten (général de brigade)
- Jacques Philippe Ottavi (général de brigade)
- Raymond César Oubxet (général de brigade)
- Nicolas Oudinot, duc de Reggio (Maréchal d'Empire)
- Ignace Laurent Joseph Stanislas d'Oullenbourg (général de division)
- Hendrick Jan van Oyen (1771–1850) (général de brigade)

== P ==
=== Pa ===
- Louis Michel Pac de Gozdawa (général de division)
- Michel Marie Pacthod (général de division)
- François Marie Sébastien Pageot (général de division)
- Joseph Pagès (général de brigade)
- Joseph Paignat (général de division)
- Pierre Claude Pajol (général de division)
- Nicolas Augustin Paliard (général de brigade)
- François Joseph Antoine Bertrand de Palmarole (général de brigade)
- Henri Dominique Marius de Palys (général de brigade)
- Emmanuel Ignace Pamplona (général de division)
- Claude Marie Joseph Pannetier, comte de Valdotte (général de division)
- Pasquale Paoli (général de division)
- Claude Étienne Paquin de Vauzlemont (général de brigade)
- Joseph Paradis (général de brigade)
- Barthélémy Étienne Parant (général de brigade)
- Pierre-Mathieu Parein du Mesnil (général de brigade)
- Marie Auguste Paris (général de division)
- Antoine Marie Paris d'Illins (général de brigade)
- Thomas Camille Gaëtan Paroletti (général de brigade)
- François Parra (général de brigade)
- Louis Partouneaux (général de division)
- François Nicolas Pascal de Kerenveyer (général de division)
- Joseph Sécret Pascal-Vallongue (général de brigade)
- Eustache Hubert Passinges, chevalier de Préchamps (général de brigade)
- Yves Marie Pastol, baron de Kéramelin (général de brigade)
- Philippe Joseph Patel (général de brigade)
- Marc Gaspard Abraham Paulet de La Bastide (général de brigade)
- Pierre Louis François Paultre de Lamotte (général de division)

=== Pe ===
- Mathieu Péalardy (général de division)
- Marc Nicolas Louis Pécheux (général de division)
- Guillaume Alexandre Thomas Pégot (général de brigade)
- Jean Gaudens Claude Pégot (général de brigade)
- Jean-Jacques Germain Pelet-Clozeau (général de division)
- Jean-Louis Pellapra (général de division)
- Joseph Pellegrin de Millon (général de brigade)
- Pierre Pelleport (général de division)
- Aimé Sulpice Victor Pelletier, baron de Montmarie (général de brigade)
- Louis François Elie Pelletier, comte de Montmarie (général de division)
- Jean-Baptiste Pelletier (général de division)
- Louis Pelletier (général de brigade)
- Raymond Pierre Penne (général de brigade)
- Guglielmo Pepe (lieutenant général)
- Joseph Pépin (général de brigade)
- Jean-Claude Pergaud (général de brigade)
- Bernard Peri (général de brigade)
- François-Marie Perichou de Kerversau (général de brigade)
- Catherine-Dominique de Pérignon (Maréchal d'Empire)
- Joseph Marie de Pernety (général de division)
- André Thomas Perreimond ou Pereymont (général de division)
- Joseph Perrin (général de brigade)
- Claude Victor-Perrin, Duc de Belluno (Maréchal d'Empire)
- Joseph Hélie Désiré Perruquet de Montrichard (général de division)
- Charles Bernard Joseph Percin, marquis de Montgaillard et de La Valette (général de brigade)
- César Pierre Pestalozzi (général de brigade)
- Paul Louis Joseph Peterinck (général de brigade)
- Augustin Louis Petiet (général de brigade)
- Claude Petit (général de brigade)
- Jean Martin Petit (général de division)
- Pierre Petitguillaume (général de division)
- François Petitjean (général de brigade)
- Pierre Étienne Petitot (général de brigade)
- Pierre Charles Petou-Desnoyers (général de brigade)
- André Pacifique Peyre (général de brigade)
- Louis Hippolyte Peyron (général de brigade)
- Armand Philippon (général de division)

=== Pi ===
- Jean-Pierre Piat (général de brigade)
- Joseph-Denis Picard (général de division)
- Jean-Charles Pichegru (général de division)
- Étienne Guillaume Picot de Bazus (général de division)
- Cyrille Simon Picquet (général de division)
- Adrien Nicolas Piédefer, marquis de La Salle (général de brigade)
- Nicolas Pierquin (général de brigade)
- Jean Ignace Pierre (général de brigade)
- Elie Marie Pierron (général de division)
- Jean Joseph Magdeleine Pijon (général de brigade)
- Louis Antoine Pille (général de division)
- Jacques Marguerite Pilotte, baron de La Barolière (général de division)
- Jean Daniel Pinet de Borde-Desforêts (général de brigade)
- Jean Pinet de Saint-Naixent (général de brigade)
- Domenico Pino
- Jean Simon Pierre Pinon (général de brigade)
- Agathon Pinot, chevalier du Petit-Bois (général de brigade)
- Pierre-Armand Pinoteau (général de brigade)
- Memmie Pinteville (général de brigade)
- Pierre Alexis de Pinteville (général de brigade)
- Alexandre Jean-Batiste Piochard, comte d'Arblay (général de division)
- Joseph Piston (général de division)
- Louis Jean Plaideux (général de brigade)
- Louis Auguste Marchand Plauzonne (général de brigade)
- Louis Augustin Plicque (général de brigade)

=== Po ===
- Pierre Poinsot de Chansac (général de division)
- François Hilarion Point (général de brigade)
- Gabriel Adrien Marie Poissonnier Desperrières (général de brigade)
- Jean Étienne Casimir Poitevin de Maureilhan (général de division)
- François René Jean de Pommereul (général de division)
- André Poncet (général de division)
- Antoine François Poncet de La Cour de Maupas (général de brigade)
- Józef Antoni Poniatowski, prince (Maréchal d'Empire)
- Jean-Marie Ponsard (général de brigade)
- Antoine Louis Popon de Maucune (général de division)
- Paul-Jean-Baptiste Poret de Morvan (général de brigade)
- Jean-François Porson (général de brigade)
- Jean-Pierre Portschy (général de brigade)
- Étienne François Raymond Pouchelon (général de brigade)
- Pierre Guillaume Pouchin de la Roche (général de brigade)
- Jean Pierre Pouget (général de division)
- Bernard Pourailly (général de brigade)
- Charles Pierre Pourcin (général de brigade)
- Antoine Eléonor Pouthier de Gouhelans (général de brigade)
- Pierre Charles Pouzet, baron de Saint-Charles (général de brigade)

=== Pr ===
- Jean André Praefke (général de brigade)
- Jean Charles Prestat (général de brigade)
- Claude Antoine Hippolyte de Préval (général de division)
- Pierre Dominique Prévost (général de brigade)
- Jean Étienne Philibert de Prez de Crassier (général de division)
- Claude Prost (général de brigade)
- Guillaume-Marcelin Proteau (général de brigade)
- Jean Proteau (général de brigade)
- Gilbert Prudon (général de brigade)
- Ythier Silvain Pryvé (général de brigade)

=== Pu ===
- Hilarion Paul Puget de Barbantane (général de division)
- Edmé Jean Antoine du Puget d'Orval (général de brigade)
- Charles Joseph Randon de Malboissière de Pully (général de division)
- Joseph Puniet de Montfort (général de brigade)
- Jacques-Pierre-Louis Puthod (général de division)

== Q ==
- Pierre Quantin (général de division)
- Paul Yves Bernard de Quélen de Stuer de Caussade, duc de La Vauguyon (général de division)
- François Jean Baptiste Quesnel (général de division)
- Jacques Quétard de La Porte (général de brigade)
- Pierre Quétineau (général de brigade)
- Mathieu Queunot (général de brigade)
- Gabriel Queyssat (général de brigade)
- Jean Charles Quinette de Cernay (général de brigade)
- Joachim Jérôme Quiot du Passage (général de division)

== R ==
=== Ra ===
- Charles Joseph Constantin Radermacher (général de brigade)
- Étienne Radet (général de division)
- Nicolas Raffet (général de brigade)
- François Rambeaud (général de brigade)
- Gabriel Pierre de Rambourgt (général de brigade)
- Jean-Pierre Ramel (général de brigade)
- Jean-Marie-Vital Ramey de Sugny (général de division)
- Antoine-Guillaume Rampon (général de division)
- Charles Joseph Randon de Malboissière, comte de Pully (général de division)
- Jean-Pierre de Ransonnet-Bosford (général de brigade)
- Charles-François Raoul (général de brigade)
- Marie Étienne de Raphélis, comte de Roquesante (général de brigade)
- Jean Rapp (général de division)
- Jean-François de Ravel de Puycontal (général de brigade)
- Jean-Baptiste Ambroise Ravier (général de brigade)
- Alexis Joseph Ravier de Jullière (général de brigade)
- Jean Nicolas Razout (général de division)

=== Re ===
- Simon Recordon (général de brigade)
- Charles Christophe Joseph Louis Reding de Biberegg (général de brigade)
- Jean Joseph Édouard Reed (général de brigade)
- Alexandre de Rège, comte Gifflenga (général de division)
- Jean Louis Christophe Régnier (général de division)
- Pierre François Joseph Régnier (général de brigade)
- Honoré Charles Reille (général de division, maréchal de France)
- Marie Antoine de Reiset (général de division)
- Victor Urbain Rémond (général de brigade)
- Charles-François Remond (général de brigade)
- Brice Jean-Baptiste Renard (général de brigade)
- Antoine François Renaud (général de brigade)
- Jean Gaspard Pascal René (général de brigade)
- Michel Reneauld (général de division)
- Jean Charles Renouard (général de brigade)
- André de Resnier (général de brigade)
- André Guillaume Resnier de Goué (général de brigade)
- Henri Thomas Reubell (général de division)
- Jean-Jacques Reubell (général de brigade)
- Henri de Reuss-Schleiz (général de brigade)
- Jean Revest (général de brigade)
- Gabriel Venance Rey (général de division)
- Guillaume Rey (général de brigade)
- Jean-André Rey (général de brigade)
- Jean-Pierre-Antoine Rey (général de brigade)
- Louis Emmanuel Rey (général de division)
- Hilaire Benoît Reynaud (général de brigade)
- Nicolas Reynaud (général de brigade)
- Jean Reynier (général de division)
- Julien Charles Louis Rheinwald (général de brigade)

=== Ri ===
- Nicolas Xavier de Ricard (général de brigade)
- Étienne Pierre Sylvestre Ricard (général de division)
- Gabriel Marie de Riccé (général de brigade)
- Joseph Léonard Richard (général de brigade)
- Jérôme Étienne Marie Richardot (général de brigade)
- Antoine Richepanse ou Richepanse, (général de division)
- Henri Richon (général de brigade)
- Jean-Louis Richter (général de division)
- Jean-Baptiste André Rifflet (général de brigade)
- Antoine Rigau ou Rigaux (général de brigade)
- André Rigaud (général de brigade)
- Antoine Rignoux (général de brigade)
- Archange Louis Rioult-Davenay (général de brigade)
- Jean-Marie Ritay (général de brigade)
- Jean Rivaud (général de division)
- Olivier Macoux Rivaud de la Raffinière (général de division)
- Pierre Emmanuel Jacques de Rivaz (général de brigade)
- Jean-Baptiste Rivet (général de brigade)

=== Ro ===
- Jean-Baptiste Robert (général de division)
- Jean Gilles André Robert (général de brigade)
- Joseph Louis Armand Robert (général de division)
- Louis Benoît Robert (général de brigade)
- Simon Robert (général de brigade)
- Antoine Joseph Robin (général de division)
- Étienne François Rocbert, baron de Lamorendière-Ducoudray (général de brigade)
- Jean Marie Donatien de Vimeur de Rochambeau (général de division)
- Jean-François Rochedragon (général de brigade)
- Jean-Pierre-Maurice de Rochon (général de brigade)
- Emmanuel de Serviez, (général de brigade)
- Antoine Roest d'Alkemade (général de brigade)
- Jean-Baptiste Roger de Lacoustande (général de brigade)
- Dominique Mansuy Roget, baron de Belloguet (général de division)
- Joseph Rogniat (général de division)
- Louis Joseph Marie Rogon de Carcaradec (général de brigade)
- François Roguet (général de division)
- César Antoine Roize (général de brigade)
- Claude Roize (général de brigade)
- Jacques Roland (général de brigade)
- Pierre Jacques Nicolas Rolland (général de brigade)
- Balthazar Romand (général de brigade)
- Joseph Romanet, chevalier du Caillaud (général de brigade)
- Albert Marie de Romé (général de brigade)
- Jean-François Rome (général de brigade)
- Jacques Alexandre Romeuf (général de brigade)
- Jean Louis Romeuf (général de brigade)
- François Marie Clément de la Roncière (général de division)
- Charles Philippe Ronsin (général de division)
- Pierre François Gabriel Ronzier (général de brigade)
- Nicolas Roque (général de brigade)
- Paul Louis Antoine de Rosières (général de division)
- Hippolyte Marie Guillaume de Rosnyvinen, comte de Piré (général de division)
- Marie Joseph Thomas Rossetti (général de brigade)
- Don Gratio Rossi (général de brigade)
- Antoine François de Rossi (général de division)
- Camille de Rossi (général de division)
- Jean Antoine Rossignol (général de division)
- Philippe Joseph de Rostaing (général de division)
- Claude Rostollant (général de brigade)
- Henri Rottembourg (général de division)
- Pierre Rouché (général de division)
- Pierre-Michel Rouelle (général de brigade)
- Antoine Rougé (général de brigade)
- Jean Grégoire Barthélemy Rouger, baron de Laplane (général de division)
- Claude Pierre Rouget (général de brigade)
- Henri Victor Roulland (général de brigade)
- Guillaume Charles Rousseau (général de brigade)
- Antoine Alexandre Rousseaux (général de division)
- François Xavier Roussel (général de brigade)
- Jean Charles Roussel (général de brigade)
- Charles Alexandre Louis Roussel de Saint-Rémy (général de division)
- Nicolas-François Roussel d'Hurbal (général de division)
- Pierre Roux de Fazillac (général de brigade)
- Philibert François Rouxel de Blanchelande (général de brigade)
- Charles Étienne Rouyer (général de brigade)
- Jean-Pascal Rouyer (général de brigade)
- Jean Victor Rouyer, baron de Saint-Victor (général de brigade)
- Marie François Rouyer (général de division)
- Joseph Stanislas François Xavier Alexis de Rovère de Fontvielle (général de brigade)

=== Ru ===
- Jean-Baptiste André Isidore Ruault de La Bonnerie (général de brigade)
- Sébastien Ruby (général de brigade)
- Louis Jacques Ruelle de Santerre (général de brigade)
- François Amable Ruffin (général de division)
- Jean-Baptiste Dominique Rusca (général de brigade)
- Ernest de Ruttemberg (général de brigade)
- Charles-Étienne-François Ruty (général de division)

== S ==
=== Sa ===
- Joseph François Claude de Sabardin (général de brigade)
- Bonaventure Hippolyte Sabatier (général de brigade)
- Jean Isaac Sabatier (général de brigade)
- Just Pasteur Sabatier (général de brigade)
- Christophe-Cortasse de Sablonet (général de brigade)
- Georges Philippe Saboureux de Fontenay (général de brigade)
- Jacques Henri de Sabrevois d'Oyenville (général de brigade)
- Louis Michel Antoine Sahuc (général de division)
- Jean Joseph François Léonard Sahuguet Damarzit de Laroche, ou d'Amarzit de Laroche (général de division)
- Mathieu Pierre Paul Saignes (général de brigade)
- Saint-Cyr Nugues (général de division)
- Gilbert Joseph Martin Bruneteto de Sainte-Suzanne (général de division)
- Jean Marie Noël Delisle de Falcon de Saint-Geniès (général de division)
- Charles Barthélemy de Saint-Fief (général de brigade)
- Antoine-Louis Decrest de Saint-Germain (général de division)
- Jean-Pierre Aaron Seimandy de Saint-Gervais (général de brigade)
- Louis-Vincent-Joseph Le Blond de Saint-Hilaire (général de division)
- Antoine Saint-Hillier (général de division)
- François Joseph de Saint-Jean, baron de Pointis (général de brigade)
- Louis Joseph Auguste Gabriel de Saint-Laurent (général de division)
- Alexis Saint-Martin (général de brigade)
- Jacques Louis Saint-Martin (général de brigade)
- Jean Étienne de Saint-Martin (général de brigade)
- David-Maurice-Joseph Mathieu de La Redorte (général de division)
- François-Houzé de Saint-Paul (général de brigade)
- Claude Marie de Saint-Quentin (général de brigade)
- Maurice Louis Saint-Rémy (général de brigade)
- Charles-Marie-Robert comte d'Escorches de Sainte Croix (général de brigade)
- Charles Saligny de San-Germano (général de division)
- Jean-Baptiste Salm (général de brigade)
- François Nicolas de Salomon (général de division)
- Pierre Marie Joseph Salomon (général de division)
- Antoine Salva (général de brigade)
- Thomas Chegaray de Sandos (général de brigade)
- Claude François Thomas Sandoz (général de brigade)
- Nicolas-Antoine Sanson (général de division)
- Antoine Joseph Santerre (général de division)
- Jean Sarrazin (général de division)
- Henri Amable Alexandre de Sarret (général de brigade)
- Jacques Thomas Sarrut (général de division)
- Adrien Joseph Saudeur (général de brigade)
- Louis François Saunier (général de division)
- Pierre François Sauret de la Borie (général de division)
- Jean Charles Sauriat (général de brigade)
- François Jean Sautter (général de brigade)
- Joseph Alexandre Belvèze de Larue de Sauviac (général de division)
- Anne Jean Marie René Savary, duc de Rovigo (général de division)
- Jean-Baptiste Saviot (général de brigade)
- Jean-Baptiste Auguste Reynaud de Savournin (général de brigade)
- George Ernst de Sayn et Wittgenstein (général de brigade)

=== Sc ===
- Marie Paul Alexandre César de Scépeaux de Bois-Guignot (général de brigade)
- François Ignace Schaal (général de division)
- Christian-Henri Schaeffer (général de brigade)
- Alexis Balthazar Henri Antoine Schauenburg (général de division)
- Nicolas Joseph Scalfort (général de brigade)
- Marc Amand Élisée Scherb (général de brigade)
- Barthélemy Louis Joseph Schérer (général de division)
- Jean Jacques Schilt (général de brigade)
- Joseph François Ignace Maximilien Schiner (général de division)
- Jean-Baptiste Schlachter (général de brigade)
- Nicolas Schmitz, (général de brigade)
- Laurent Schobert (général de brigade)
- Charles Jean Theodore Schoenmezel (général de brigade)
- Nicolas Joseph Schreiber (général de brigade)
- Jean Adam Schramm (général de division)
- Jean Paul Adam Schramm (général de division)
- François Xavier de Schwarz (général de brigade)
- Henri César Auguste Schwiter (général de brigade)

=== Se ===
- Horace François Bastien Sébastiani de La Porta (général de division)
- Étienne Vincent de Sédillot de Fontaine (général de brigade)
- Jacques Marie Blaise de Segond de Sederon (général de brigade)
- Louis-Philippe de Ségur (général de brigade)
- Philippe-Paul de Ségur (général de division)
- Jean-Baptiste Pierre de Semellé (général de division)
- Alexandre-François de Senarmont (général de division)
- Alexandre-Antoine Hureau de Senarmont (général de division)
- Louis Thomas Senneton de Chermont (général de brigade)
- Philippe Joseph Victoire de Senneville (général de brigade)
- Charles Guillaume Sepher (général de brigade)
- Jean-Mathieu Seras (général de division)
- Charles Catherin Sériziat (général de brigade)
- Denis Étienne Seron (général de brigade)
- Jean Nicolas Seroux de Fay (général de division)
- Jean-Baptiste Séroux d'Agincourt (général de brigade)
- Joseph Serrant (général de brigade)
- Joseph François Régis Camille de Serre de Gras (général de brigade)
- Jean-Mathieu-Philibert Sérurier (Maréchal d'Empire)
- Joseph Servan de Gerbey (général de division)
- Filippo Severoli (général de division)
- Dominique Sheldon (général de division)

=== Si ===
- Jacques François Sibot (général de brigade)
- Benoît Prosper Sibuet (général de brigade)
- Joseph Victorin Sicard (général de brigade)
- Jean Julien Sierawski de Gozdawa (général de brigade)
- Pierre Louis François Silly (général de brigade)
- Jean-Louis Simien (général de brigade)
- François Martin Valentin Simmer (général de division)
- Édouard François Simon (général de division)
- Henri Simon (général de brigade)
- François Simon-Grandchamps (général de brigade)
- Pierre Joseph Victor Simonneau (général de brigade)
- Léopold Prosper Philibert Sionville (général de brigade)
- Jean-Baptiste de Bressolles de Siscé (général de brigade)
- Michel François de Sistrières (général de brigade)
- Marc Slivarich de Heldenbourg (général de brigade)

=== So ===
- Michel Sokolnicki de Nowina, comte (général de brigade)
- Pierre Sol-Beauclair (général de brigade)
- Guillaume Soland (général de brigade)
- Jean-Baptiste Solignac (général de division)
- Gabriel de Sombs de Fajac (général de brigade)
- Justinien-Victor Somis (général de division)
- Jean-Marie Songeon (général de brigade)
- Charles Louis Didier Songis l'Aîné (général de division)
- Nicolas-Marie Songis des Courbons (général de division)
- Louis Charles Barthélémy Sopransi (général de brigade)
- Jean-Barthélemot Sorbier (général de division)
- Jean Joseph Augustin Sorbier (général de brigade)
- Nicolas Thomas Sorlus-Crause (général de brigade)
- Joseph Sorlus de Bart (général de brigade)
- Joseph Souham (général de division)
- Antoine Soulheirac (général de brigade)
- Jérôme Soulès (général de brigade)
- Jean Antoine Soulier (général de brigade)
- Jean-Jacques François de Soulier (général de brigade)
- Jean-de-Dieu Soult, duc de Dalmatie (Maréchal d'Empire])
- Pierre Benoît Soult (général de division)
- Jean-Louis Soye (général de brigade)
- Louis Stanislas Xavier Soyez (général de brigade)
- Alexandre Séraphin Joseph de Sparre (général de division)
- Louis Ernest Joseph de Sparre (général de division)
- Nicolas Philippe Xavier Spital (général de brigade)

=== St-Su ===
- Jean André Stedman (général de brigade)
- Louis Stephan (général de brigade)
- Henri Christian Michel de Stengel (général de division)
- Maximilien Ferdinand Thomas Stettenhofen (général de division)
- Adrien Guillaume Storm de Grave (général de brigade)
- Jean Baptiste Alexandre Strolz (général de division)
- Jacques Gervais, baron Subervie (général de division)
- Louis-Gabriel Suchet, duc d'Albufera (Maréchal d'Empire)
- Louis Suden (général de brigade)
- Jean Sultzmann (général de brigade)
- Louis Surreau de Calbecq (général de brigade)
- François Suzamicq (général de brigade)

== T ==
- Alexandre Camille Taponier (général de division)
- Jean Joseph Tarayre (général de division)
- Jean-Henri Robert Tascher de La Pagerie (général de brigade)
- Éloi Charlemagne Taupin (général de division)
- Albert Louis Valentin Taviel (général de division)
- Jean du Teil, chevalier du Teil de Beaumont (général de division)
- Germain-Felix Tennet de Laubadère (général de brigade)
- Denis Terreyre (général de brigade)
- Jacques Terrier, baron de Palante (général de brigade)
- François Antoine Teste (général de division)
- Marc Bruno Teste (général de brigade)
- Raymond Jean-Baptiste Teulet (général de brigade)
- Jean Victor Tharreau (général de division)
- Louis Marie Joseph Thévenet (général de brigade)
- Louis Michel Auguste Thévenet (général de brigade)
- François Thévenot (général de brigade)
- Jean Thévet de Lessert (général de brigade)
- Paul Charles François Adrien Henri Dieudonné Thiébault (général de division)
- Jean-François Thierry (général de division)
- Charles Désiré Thimonet des Gaudières (général de brigade)
- François Thirion (général de division)
- Nicolas Marin Thiry (général de brigade)
- Jean-Baptiste Tholmé (général de brigade)
- David-Alexis Tholosé (général de brigade)
- Jean Thomas (général de brigade)
- Adrien Martial Thomas de Saint-Henry (général de brigade)
- Jean Guillaume Barthélemy Thomières (général de brigade)
- François Joseph Thorillon du Bourg de Vacherolles (général de brigade)
- Pierre Jacques Thorin de La Thanne (général de brigade)
- Louis Adrien Théodore Thory (général de brigade)
- Jacques Thouvenot (général de brigade)
- Pierre Thouvenot (général de division)
- Henri Joseph Thurning de Ryss (général de brigade)
- Jacques Louis François Delaistre Tilly (général de division)
- Jean-Baptiste Cyrus de Timbrune de Thiembronne (général de division)
- Ralph Dundas Tindal (général de division)
- Louis Tirlet (général de division)
- Mathieu Tisson (général de brigade)
- Joseph de Tolinski (général de brigade)
- Louis de Tolozan (général de brigade)
- Louis De Tolzan (général de brigade)
- Anne Edmé Alexandre de Toulongeon (général de brigade)
- Hippolyte-Jean-René de Toulongeon (général de division)
- Charles Bertin Gaston Chapuis de Tourville (général de division)
- Antoine Étienne de Tousard (général de brigade)
- Toussaint Louverture (général de division)
- Jean François Toussaint (général de brigade)
- Étienne Jacques Travers, baron de Jever (général de brigade)
- Jean-Pierre Travot (général de division)
- Pierre Jean Treich des Farges (général de brigade)
- Anne-François-Charles Trelliard (général de division)
- Louis Jean David Trésor du Bactot (général de brigade)
- Camille Alphonse Trézel (général de division)
- Jean-Joseph Triaire (général de brigade)
- Auguste Joseph Tribout (général de division)
- François Laurent Tricotel (général de brigade)
- Sébastien Trochereau de Bouillay (général de brigade)
- Charles Trouard de Riolles (général de brigade)
- Laurent Jean François Truguet (Amiral)
- André Tudier (général de brigade)
- Jean-Henri Charles Joseph Tugnot de Lanoye (général de brigade)
- Augustin Tuncq (général de division)
- Louis Marie Turreau de Garambouville, baron de Linières (général de division)

== U ==
- Louis Jean Charles Urtubie (général de brigade)
- Joseph François Jean-Baptiste d'Urre de Molans (général de division)
- Théodore Bernard Simon Durtubisse (général de brigade)

== V ==
- Marc-Antoine Coban (général de brigade)
- François Vachot (général de brigade)
- Martial Vachot (général de division)
- Jean-Baptiste Vaillant (général de brigade)
- Daniel Thomas Olry de Valcin (général de brigade)
- Sylvain Charles Valée (général de division)
- François Valentin (général de brigade)
- Antoine Joseph Marie de Valette (général de brigade)
- Paul Isaïe Valframbert (général de brigade)
- Jean-Marie Valhubert (général de brigade)
- Jean-André Valletaux (général de brigade)
- Gabriel Théodore Vallier de Lapeyrouse (général de brigade)
- Louis Vallin (général de division)
- Guy Louis Henri de Valory (général de brigade)
- François Valterre (général de brigade)
- Dominique Vandamme, comte d'Unsebourg (général de division)
- Antoine Baudoin Gisbert Van de Dedem van de Gelder (général de division)
- Edmé-Martin Vandermaesen (général de division)
- Adrien Van Helden (général de brigade)
- Dirk Van Hogendorp (général de division)
- Jean Baptiste Van Merlen (général de brigade)
- Albert Van Ryssel (général de brigade)
- Onno Xavier Van Sandick (général de brigade)
- Pierre Jean Van Stabel (Contre-amiral)
- Louis-Prix Varé (général de brigade)
- Marie Louis de Varennes (général de brigade)
- Jean-Pierre Varin (général de brigade)
- Louis Vasserot (général de division)
- Achille Victor Fortuné de Vaufreland-Piscatory (général de brigade)
- Antoine Joseph Veaux (général de division)
- Dominique Honoré Antoine Vedel (général de division)
- Michel Veilande (général de brigade)
- Jean Gaspard de Vence (contre-amiral)
- Paul Verbigier de Saint-Paul (général de brigade)
- Jean-Antoine Verdier (général de division)
- Pierre François Verger-Dubareau (général de brigade)
- François de Vergès (général de brigade)
- Jean-Marie Vergez (général de brigade)
- Jacques Paul Vergnes (général de brigade)
- Pierre François Verne (général de brigade)
- François Vernier (général de brigade)
- César Verny (général de brigade)
- Claude Vezu (général de division)
- Honoré Vial (général de division)
- Jacques Laurent Louis Augustin Vial (général de division)
- Jean-Baptiste Théodore Vialanes ou Viallanes (général de brigade)
- Charles Guillaume Vial d'Alais (général de brigade)
- Sébastien Viala (général de brigade)
- Pierre Vialle (général de division)
- François Pierre de Viantaix (général de brigade)
- Louis Joseph Vichery (général de division)
- Pierre Marie Gabriel Vidalot du Sirat (général de brigade)
- Georges Michel Vietinghoff (général de division)
- Jean-Louis de Vieusseux (général de brigade)
- Jacques-Pierre Orillard de Villemanzy (général de division)
- François Félix Vignes (général de brigade)
- Martin Vignolle (général de division)
- Jean-Baptiste Vigoureux Duplessis (général de division)
- Jean-Marie de Villaret-Joyeuse (général de brigade)
- Eugène-Casimir Villatte, comte d'Outremont (général de division)
- Jean-Louis Villatte (général de brigade)
- Pierre Justin Marchand de Villionne (général de brigade)
- Jean Joseph Villot (général de brigade)
- Michel Villot (général de brigade)
- Donatien-Marie-Joseph de Vimeur, vicomte de Rochambeau (général de division)
- Louis Antoine Vimeux (général de division)
- Henri Catherine Balthazard Vincent (général de division)
- Humbert Marie Vincent (général de brigade)
- Luc Antoine Vincent (général de brigade)
- Rémy Vincent (général de division)
- Gilbert Julian Vinot (général de brigade)
- François Charles Vireau de Sombreuil (général de division)
- Étienne Louis Vital (général de brigade)
- Guillaume Raymond Amant Viviès, baron de La Prade (général de brigade)
- Johann Hendrick Voet (général de division)
- Jean-Baptiste Voillot (général de brigade)
- Théophile Voirol (général de brigade)
- François Pierre Félix Vonderweidt (général de brigade)
- Marie Joseph Simon Alexis Vonderweidt (général de brigade)
- Alexandre Voulland (général de division)
- Denis Félix de Vrigny (général de brigade)

== W ==
- Frédéric Henri Walther (général de division)
- Jean Thomas Ward (général de brigade)
- Nicolas Daniel Warel de Beauvoir (général de division)
- Jean-Baptiste Warnesson de Grandchamps (général de brigade)
- Pierre Watier, comte de Saint-Alphonse (général de division)
- François Isidore Wathiez (général de division)
- François Watrin (général de division)
- Erhard Gustave de Wedel (général de brigade)
- François Werlé (général de brigade)
- Jean Guillaume Chrétien Wernecke (général de brigade)
- François-Joseph Westermann (général de brigade)
- Joseph Wielhorski de Kierdeja (général de division)
- Amédée Willot (général de division)
- Georges Félix de Wimpffen (général de division)
- François Louis de Wimpffen de Bornebourg (général de division)
- Jean-Guillaume de Winter (général de brigade)
- Louis Wirion (général de brigade)
- Jean-Christophe Wisch (général de division)
- Charles Victor Woirgard (général de brigade)
- Marc François Jérôme Wolff (général de division)
- Jan Henryk Wołodkowicz (général de brigade)
- Armand Nicolas Wouillemont de Vivier (général de brigade)
- Carl Philipp von Wrede (Lieutenant général)
- Maximilien Constantin de Wurmser (général de brigade)

== X ==
- Charles Antoine Dominique Xaintrailles, comte de Lauthier (général de division)

== Y ==
- Jean-Frédéric Yvendorff (général de brigade)

== Z ==
- Józef Zajączek (général de division)
- Joseph Camille Jules Zenardi (général de brigade)
- Christian Noël de Zimmerman (général de brigade)
- Édouard Zoltowski de Ogonczyk (général de brigade)
- Carlo Zucchi (général de brigade)

== See also ==
- List of French general officers (Peninsular War)
