= D'Albignac =

D'Albignac is a surname. Notable people with the surname include:

- Louis Alexandre d'Albignac (1739–1825), French general
- Philippe François Maurice d'Albignac (1775–1824), French general
