= General Perrin =

General Perrin may refer to:

- Abner Monroe Perrin (1827–1864), Confederate States Army brigadier general
- Herbert T. Perrin (1893–1962), U.S. Army brigadier general
- Joseph Perrin (1754–1800), French general of the Revolutionary Wars

== See also ==
- Louis François Perrin de Précy (1742–1820), French Army lieutenant general
