= Pierre Joseph Joubert de La Salette =

Pierre Joseph Joubert de la Salette (3 September 1743 – 4 February 1833) was a French General of the Revolution and the Empire, a poet, musicologist and musicographer.

== Military career ==
Pierre Joseph Joubert de la Salette entered service on 4 April 1757, as an aspirant in the artillery corps, he became a pupil of artillery 10 September 1759, under lieutenant 7 September 1762, second lieutenant 1 January 1763, first lieutenant 15 October 1765, and captain by commission 1 October 1772. Second captain 21 February 1777, captain of bombers 3 June 1779, captain of gunners 5 April 1780, he was made a chevalier of the Order of Saint Louis 3 September 1786.

On 22 August 1791, he was appointed Lieutenant-Colonel of the 1st Artillery Regiment, and on 22 September 1792, he took command of the artillery at Metz, then at Longwy on 2 February 1793. On 31 May of the same year, he received his Brigade Commander's certificate and on 16 June, he was assigned to the Army of the Eastern Pyrenees as Chief of the General Staff of the Artillery. On August 11, 1793, he was promoted to the rank of brigadier general, and on 23 October, he assumed command of the artillery of the Army of the Eastern Pyrenees before assuming the command of the artillery of the Army of Italy 29 décembre 1793, but remained in the army of the Eastern Pyrenees until 2 December 1794.

On 2 June 1795, he was appointed Inspector General and Commander of the Artillery Inspection in the 7th Military Division, then in the 12th Division on 31 July 1796. He retired on 7 January 1800.

He became a member of the society of sciences and arts of Grenoble, and correspondent of the Académie de Dijon. In 1797, he became one of the instigators of the creation of the museum of Grenoble by launching a petition to save works of art of the province du Dauphiné. He published several works related to music.

Pierre Joseph Joubert de la Salette died 4 février 1833, in Grenoble, aged 89.

== Books ==
- Sténographie musicale ou manière abrégée d'écriture de la musique. Goujon imprimeur libraire. 1805.
- De la notation musicale en général et en particulier de celle du système grec. le Normant. 1817.
- Considérations sur les divers systèmes de la musique ancienne et moderne, et sur le genre enharmonique des Grecs, tome 1 et 2. Goujon imprimeur libraire. 1810.

== Sources ==
- "Generals Who Served in the French Army during the Period 1789 - 1814: Jablonowski to Jurgy de la Varenne". Napoléon-séries.
- "Les généraux français et étrangers ayant servis dans la Grande Armée".
- Robinet, Jean-François; Robert, Adolphe; Le Chaplain, Julien (1899). Dictionnaire historique et biographique de la révolution et de l'empire, 1789-1815, volume 2. Librairie Historique de la révolution et de l’empire. p. 233..
- Six, Georges (1934). "Joubert de la Salette (Pierre-Joseph)". Dictionnaire biographique des généraux et amiraux français de la Révolution et de l'Empire: 1792–1814 (in French). Vol. 1. Paris: Librairie Historique et Nobilaire. pp. 607–608.
