= Pierre Antoine François Huber =

French Army brigadier general

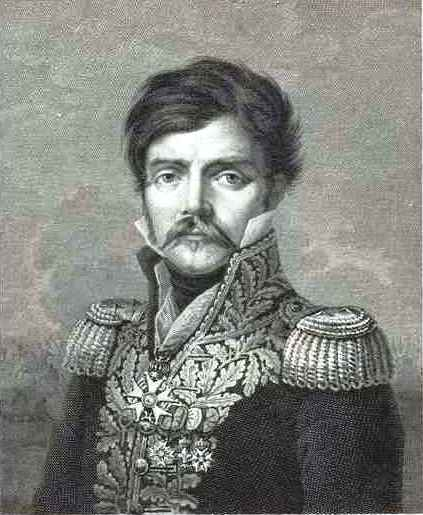
Pierre Antoine Huber

Pierre Antoine François, baron Huber (French pronunciation: [pjɛʁ ɑ̃twan fʁɑ̃swa uba]; December 20, 1775 in Sankt Wendel – April 26, 1832 in Paris) was a brigadier general in the French army.

== Biography ==
Huber began his career in the French Revolutionary Army on August 13, 1793 in the First Regiment de Chasseurs-à-Cheval. On March 11, 1813 he was appointed Colonel, and August 15 of the same year Baron of the Empire. On March 15, 1814 Napoleon appointed him to the command of the First Regiment de Chasseurs-à-Cheval with the rank of brigadier general.

Upon his return from Elba Napoleon gave him the command of the first brigade of cavalry of the 2nd corps of the Army of the North. After the Napoleonic wars Huber was appointed Inspector General of Cavalry on June 16, 1819. He resigned from public office on December 17, 1826.

== Honors ==
- Order of Saint Louis
- July 13, 1823 "Grand Officier" of the Legion of Honour
- November 23, 1823 Spanish Order of St. Ferdinand
- Huber's name is inscribed on the Arc de Triomphe in Paris in column 34

== See also ==
- List of French generals of the Revolutionary and Napoleonic Wars

== Sources ==
- Six, Georges (1934). Dictionnaire biographique des généraux et amiraux de la Révolution et de l'Empire, Vol. I (in French). Paris, France: Librairie historique et nobiliaire. ISBN 978-2-402-49916-3.
