= Charles Antoine Manhès =

French general

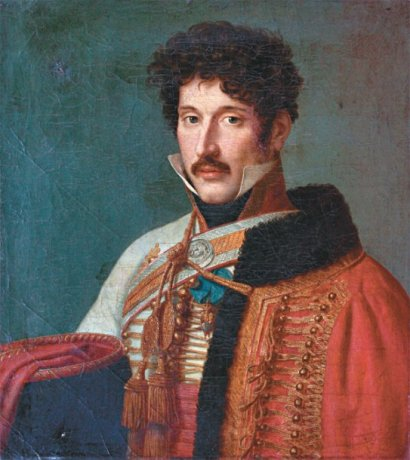
Charles Antoine Manhès.

Charles Antoine Manhès (French pronunciation: [ʃaʁl ɑ̃twan manɛ]; 4 November 1777 – 26 August 1854) was a French general. He worked as aide-de-camp to Joachim Murat, and later led the repression of brigandage in the Kingdom of Naples during Murat's reign.

Manhès, a young major general, was also a member of the Neapolitan nobility by marriage.

== See also ==
- List of French generals of the Revolutionary and Napoleonic Wars
