= Jean Dembarrère =

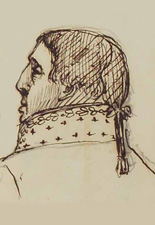
- Born: 3 July 1747; Tarbes, Hautes-Pyrénées, France
- Military career
- Allegiance: Kingdom of France; First French Republic; First French Empire
- Branch: (Kingdom of France) French Royal Army; French Revolutionary Army; French Imperial Army
- Rank: Général de division
- Conflicts: French Revolutionary Wars; Napoleonic Wars
- Awards: Legion of Honour (Grand Officier); Order of Saint Louis (Knight)

Jean, comte Dembarrère (3 July 1747 – 3 March 1828) was a French general and engineer during the French Revolutionary and Napoleonic Wars.

== Biography ==
Born into a noble family in Tarbes (Hautes-Pyrénées), Dembarrère entered the École royale du génie de Mézières in 1768.

A military engineer, he was head of engineering for the Army of Italy. He was a later a member of the Sénat conservateur which deposed Napoleon and restored the Bourbons.

He was a grand officer of the Legion of Honour and a knight of the Order of Saint Louis. His name is one of the 660 inscribed under the Arc du Triomphe.

== Works ==
- Coup d'oeil sur les parties diverses de la science militaire (1783)
- Eloge historique de Vauban (1784)
- Observations sur un imprimé du lieutenant-général comte de Sainte-Suzanne (1819)
- Chandelleries à opérer dans le système des places fortes (1819).

== See also ==
- List of French generals of the Revolutionary and Napoleonic Wars
