= Jean-Bernard Gauthier de Murnan =

French officer

Jean-Bernard Gauthier de Murnan (1748 in Bourg-en-Bresse – 27 September 1796) was a French officer for the Continental Army and a French general during the French Revolution.

Jean-Bernard Gauthier was born in a family of jurists in Bourg-en-Bresse (now Ain département) of France. He was baptized on 28 November 1748. He became an officer in the French Royal Army. When he was young, he had to leave France after a duel. He served as a cavalry officer and then military engineer in the Imperial Russian Army. He was hired as a lieutenant in a regiment of dragoons in Smolensk. He was under the command of Prince Golitsyn until 1776, when he became Captain-Engineer, after studying at the Moscow University.

When he returned to France, he was sent to support the newly born United States as a Lt. Colonel of the Engineers in the Continental Army. In the French Revolutionary Army, he was appointed Colonel of the Infantry, then Colonel of the Cavalry, and then promoted to a Brigade General in command of the cavalry.

== American Revolutionary War service ==
He was later sent to the United States with a group of military engineers, including Captain Pierre Charles L'Enfant and Colonel Louis Lebègue Duportail to support the Americans, who lacked military engineers, during the Revolutionary War. It is pointed out that the massive French military participation took place in 1781. Starting in January 1777, he was under the direction of General John Sullivan. In March 1778, he was promoted to major in the US Army Corps of Engineers by the Continental Congress. He participated in the Massachusetts Campaign in 1778.

Then, with General George Washington, he served in the Sullivan Expedition against the 'six Indians Nations', up to the current Wyoming. Under French Brigadier General Marquis de Choisy, he took part to the besieging of York and Gloucester in 1781. Following a special decision of the US Congress, he was commissioned in September 1783 lieutenant colonel by brevet by the Continental Army.

== French Army service ==
In 1784, he returned to France. He married Andrée Claudine Sain on 30 September 1784, in Lyon. He was back in the French Army when the First Coalition against the revolutionaries in France took place (see also French Revolutionary Wars).

In 1791, he was promoted lieutenant-colonel, serving in the infantry, then serving as Adjudant-Général from May 1791, namely in Sedan retrenched camp. He was then promoted colonel, serving as Chief-of-Staff of the Army on the Sambre. In 1792, he became Colonel of the 35th Infantry Regiment. Therefore, he was at the Battle of Valmy on 20 September 1792 and the Battle of Jemmapes on 6 November 1792. In January 1793 he became colonel of the 13th Dragoon Regiment. Promoted as Brigade-General, he commanded the right flank of the Northern Army with General Adam Philippe Custine. Tired, he left the army and retired around Bourg-en-Bresse. He was twice arrested during the La Terreur in spring 1794. He died on 27 September 1796, in Villereversure, Ain.

For his duties, he received Croix de Saint-Louis in 1791, and for his services during the American Revolutionary War he became member of the Society of the Cincinnati in 1783.

He was the uncle of First French Empire General Aubry, killed at the Battle of Leipzig in 1813, and cousin of the member of the revolutionary French National Convention Gauthier des Orcières, also called Gauthier de l'Ain.
