= Pierre César Dery =

French general

Pierre César Dery (2 February 1768 – 18 October 1812) was a general of France.
