= François Guillaume Barthélémy Laurent =

François Barthélemy Guillaume Laurent
- Born: 24 August 1750; Saint-Amand-en-Puisaye (Nièvre)
- Died: 14 September 1825 (aged 75); Paris, France
- Military career
- Allegiance: France
- Branch: French Army
- Service years: 1767–1816
- Rank: Major General
- Conflicts: French Revolutionary Wars; Napoleonic Wars
- Awards: Order of Saint-Louis (1816); Légion d'honneur (1804)

François Barthélemy Guillaume Laurent, 24 August 1750 in Saint-Amand-en-Puisaye (Nièvre) – 14 September 1825 in Paris, was a French general of the French Revolutionary Wars and the Napoleonic Wars.

== Biography ==
He was the son of François Laurent, a clothier, and Françoise Bergery. He married Marie-Anne Mallet and his son, Louis François Alcindor Laurent (1802–1850) also embraced a military career. He joined the Régiment Royal on 10 May 1767. (Note: The regiment was re-formed in 1775 as the Regiment de Brie, with the 2nd and 4th battalions, and included units from Strasbourg. In 1794 it was reformed as the 24th Demi-brigade.) Part of the regiment participated in the Siege of Yorktown, 1781, although it is not clear if Laurent was with the battalions that served there; another battalion served in Martinique under command of François Claude Amour, marquis de Bouillé.

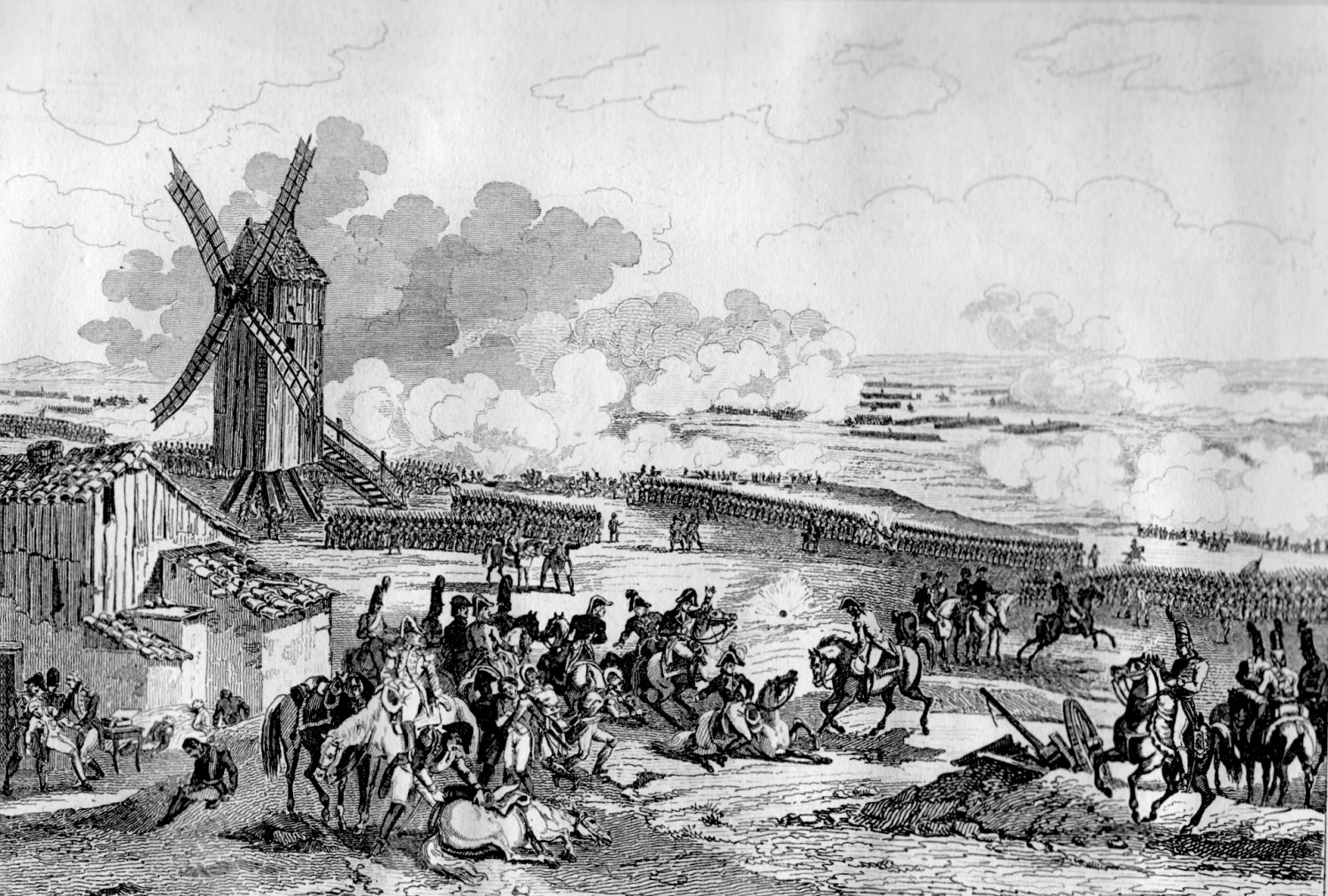
Laurent participated in the Battle of Valmy, 1792.

Laurent was a simple soldier at the outbreak of the French Revolution in 1789. Based on meritorious actions, he was promoted to brigadier general in 1794 and served in several different armies in France's campaigns against the First and Second coalitions. He was at the Battle of Valmy. He also participated in the first and the second battles at Lines of Weissenburg in 1793, as well as battles at Battle of Saverne and Landau with the Army of the Moselle; he was wounded twice in the leg, once traveling between Sluis where he was headquartered, and Brussels. He was responsible for defending the coast of Zeeland. He served continuously until the Treaty of Campo Formio, despite his leg injury, often on the front line. He was made a Commander of the Legion of Honor on the recommendation of Jean François Aimé Dejean June 1804. Subsequently he was employed in the department of Jemmapes.

=== Russian campaign of 1812 ===
In preparation for the Russian campaign of 1812, Laurent was restored to active service; he commanded the third brigade of the National guard with the troops of Magdeburg.

He was appointed major general on 13 July 1813, and commanded the military base at Montmedy. Upon the Bourbon Restoration, he received the Order of St. Louis (Chevalier), and retired from the military in 1816.

== Notes, citations and sources ==
=== Sources ===
- Liévyns, A., and Jean-Maurice Verdot et Pierre Bégat, Fastes de la légion-d'honneur : biographie de tous les décorés accompagnée de l'histoire législative et réglementaire de l'ordre. t. 3, Paris, au bureau de l'Administration, 1844–1847, p. 322–323.
- Broughton, Tony. Generals Who Served in the French Army during the Period 1789 – 1814. Laurent. Napoleonseries.org Accessed 7 April 2015.
- (in French) Beauvais, Charles-Théodore and Jacques Philippe Voïart. Victoires, conquêtes, désastres, revers et guerres civiles des Français, de 1792 à 1815: Biographie militaire française: Tables du temple de la gloire, H-Z. Table géographique. Appendices aux Tables du temple de la gloire. C. L. F. Panckoucke, 1822,.
