= Simon de Faultrier =

Simon de Faultrier (1763–1832) was a French general during the Napoleonic Wars.

Faultrier was born in Metz. Son of an artillery officer, he enlisted very young at the Artillery School of Metz. He became lieutenant in 1781 and captain in 1790. Faultrier fought during the French Revolutionary Wars with the Army of the North, the Army of the Moselle and the Army of Sambre and Meuse. He fought at the Battle of Arlon and the Battle of Fleurus in 1794. Then, Faultrier fought in Germany and Italy, with the rank of colonel. Faultrier was wounded at the Siege of Verona in October 1805. Faultrier took command of the artillery in Bruges. He was promoted to brigadier general in 1802. Faultrier then commanded the artillery at Valence. He received the Legion of Honour, first as knight, then as officer. In 1807, he commanded the artillery in Strasbourg and then went with the French army in Spain. General Faultrier left the army in 1812 and died in 1815.

== Sources ==
- Mullié, Charles (1852). "Faultrier (Simon de)" . Biographie des célébrités militaires des armées de terre et de mer de 1789 à 1850 (in French). Paris: Poignavant et Compagnie.
- Émile Auguste Bégin: Biographie de la Moselle ou, Histoire par ordre alphabétique de toutes les personnes nées dans ce département, qui se sont fait remarquer par leurs actions, leurs talents, leurs écrits, leurs vertus, ou leurs crimes, Volume 2, 1829.
