= Pierre Alexandre Joseph Allent =

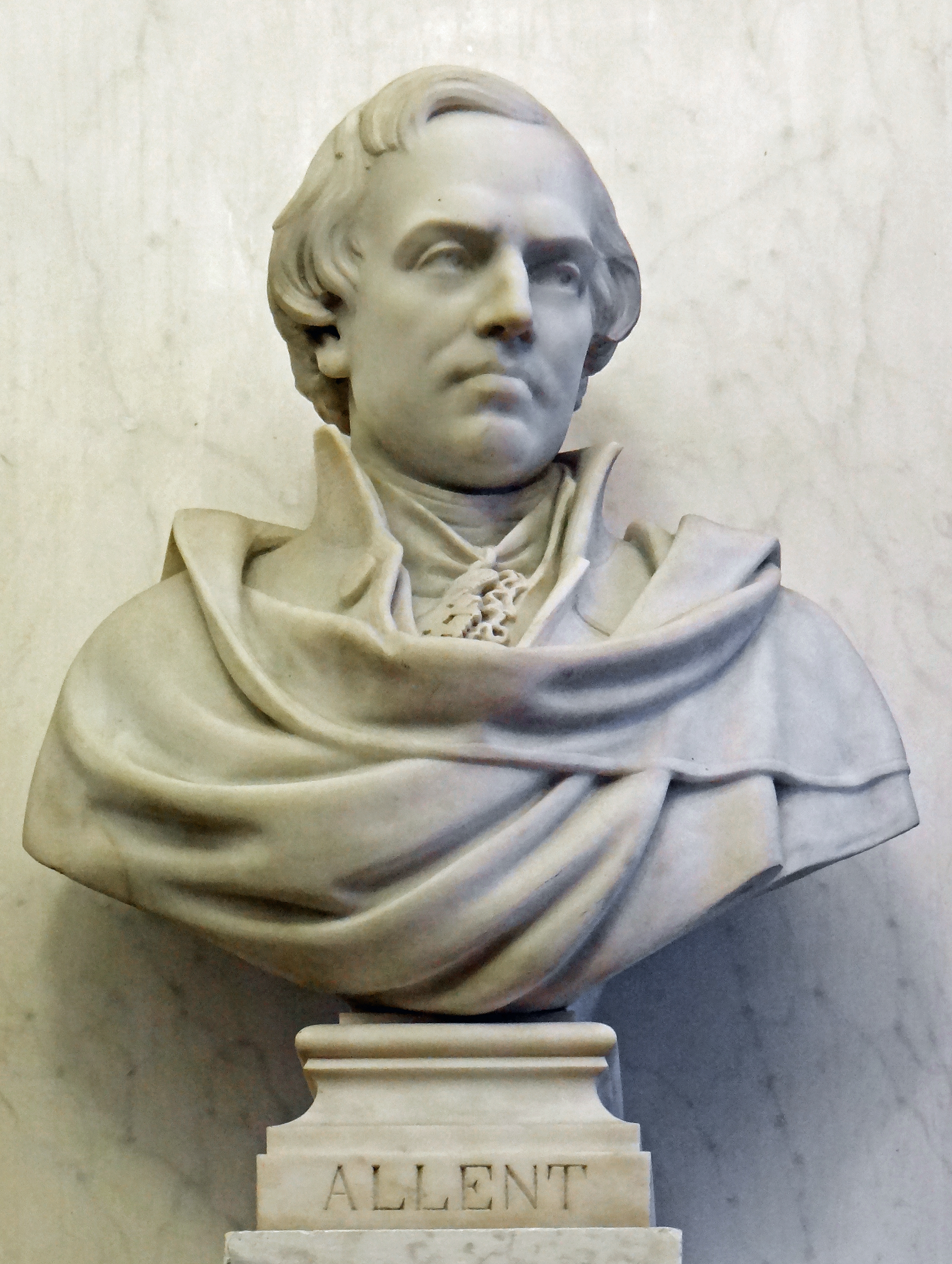
Bust of Allent in the library of the Conseil d'État, France

Pierre Alexandre Joseph Allent (9 August 1772 – 6 July 1837) was a French général de division (major general). He served in the Chamber of Deputies under the Bourbon Restoration and in the Chamber of Peers under the July Monarchy. He was a knight of the Order of Saint Louis and a commander of the Legion of Honour.

Allent was born in Saint-Omer, Pas de Calais. He died in Paris in 1837.

He was created a chevalier de l'empire by decree in 1810.

== Biography ==
Pierre Alexandre Joseph Allent was born on August 9, 1772, in Saint-Omer, in the Pas-de-Calais region.

He began his military career as a volunteer gunner in a regiment in Pas-de-Calais and served in the Siege of Lille (1792) in October 1792. He took part in the Revolutionary and Napoleonic Wars.

In poor health, Lazare Carnot called him to the topographical office and entrusted him with important missions.

Napoleon appointed him secretary of the committee responsible for reviewing defense plans. From its inception, he was part of the joint committee on public works, and remained a member for thirty years.

He was appointed to assist Joseph Bonaparte in defending Paris in 1814, as chief of staff of the Paris National Guard. To this end, he was promoted to brigadier general on January 28, 1814. On May 31, 1814, he was promoted to lieutenant general and became chief of staff of the Kingdom's National Guard (France) and inspector general of the National Guard.

He was appointed Conseiller d'État in 1814. He served as Under Secretary of State for War between 1817 and 1819 under Marshal Gouvion-Saint-Cyr. In 1819, he was appointed President of the Council of State, where he remained until his death. He was elected deputy for Pas-de-Calais on August 1, 1828.

He was appointed Peer of France in 1832. He sits in the Chamber of Peers (France).

He is buried in the Père Lachaise Cemetery (10th division).
