= Joseph Perrin =

French general

Joseph Perrin (28 February 1754 – 9 June 1800 in Genoa, Italy) was a French general of the Revolutionary Wars.

== Career ==
Perrin enlisted in the French army in 1770 as a soldier in the Lorraine Infantry Regiment. He became sergeant major in 1784, second lieutenant in 1790 and lieutenant in 1791; then he was appointed chef de bataillon on 31 December 1793. On 21 March 1794 he was appointed chef de brigade in the 94th Infantry Regiment; then he became commander of the 2nd Line Infantry Half-Brigade on 19 April 1796. He was promoted to provisional brigade general on 5 June 1800 but he died on 9 June from a wound sustained during the Siege of Genoa in Italy.

== Family life ==
He was the son of Agathe Perrin (1724–1781). He first got married around 1780; then he married Catherine Heer (1763–1836) around 1800.

== See also ==
- List of French generals of the Revolutionary and Napoleonic Wars

== Sources ==
- "Generals Who Served in the French Army during the Period 1789 - 1814: Eberle to Exelmans". Napoléon-séries.
- "Napoléon.org.pl" (in Polish). Napoléon.org. Archived from the original on 2014-10-06.
- Beauvais, Charles Théodore; Parisot, Vincent (January 1822). Victoires, conquêtes, revers et guerres civiles des Français, depuis les Gaulois jusqu'en 1792, tome 26 (in French). C.L.F Panckoucke. p. 132..
