= Pierre Antoine Anselme Malet =

Comte Pierre Antoine Anselme Jean Laurent Malet (French pronunciation: [pjɛʁ ɑ̃twan ɑ̃sɛlm ʒɑ̃ lɔʁɑ̃ malɛ]; 14 August 1773 – 9 August 1815) was a maréchal de camp, and général de brigade. He commanded the 3e régiment de chasseurs à pied (Middle Guard) at Waterloo; mortally wounded in this battle by a bullet in the left shoulder, he died of his wounds in the field-hospital at Charleroi.
