= Louis Alexandre d'Albignac =

French soldier (1739–1825)

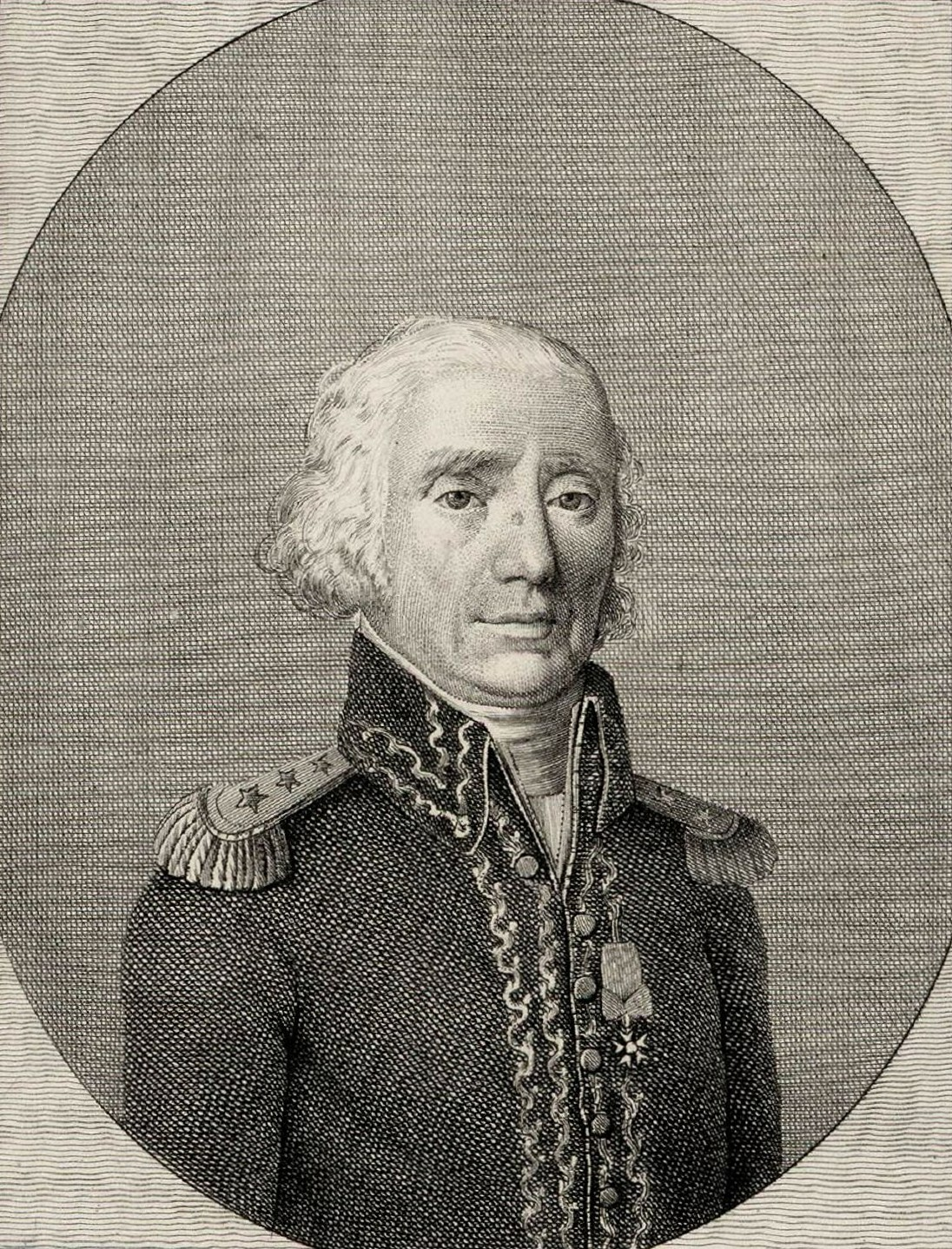
Louis Alexandre Portrait

Louis Alexandre d'Albignac (1739–1825) was a French général de division (major general). He was a chevalier of the Legion of Honour and a commander of the Order of Saint Louis.
