= Philippe François Maurice d'Albignac =

Philippe François Maurice d'Albignac (July 1775 – January 1824), comte d'Albignac, comte de Ried, was a French général de brigade (brigadier general).
