= Agoult family =

French noble lineage

- Family coat of arms.
- Origin: Provence
- Titles: Counts, barons
- Connected families: Kingdom of France; Bourbon Restoration in France; July Monarchy; Second empire France
- Motto: 1- «Hospitalité d'Agoult» 2- «Avidus committere pugnam» (1- Hospitality of Agoult; 2- Avidus committere pugnam (eager to do battle))

The Agoult family (also spelled Agout) was a French noble lineage of feudal origin from Provence. It emerged in the late 11th century in the county of Apt and became extinct in 1915.

The family developed several branches in Provence and Dauphiné and held a prominent position within the Provençal nobility until the extinction of the senior line in the early 16th century.

Following an alliance with the last bearer of the name, the Séguier family adopted the name, titles, and arms of the Agoult family.

== History ==
=== Origins ===
The Agoult (or Agoult-Simiane) family is first mentioned in a document dated 992, a relatively late appearance in the sources compared with other regional noble families.

The act of 14 November 992 records a donation by Garac of Castellane-Lacoste to Imbert (or Humbert I) of Agoult as compensation for the murder of Imbert's father. At the request of Bishop Thierry, Imbert received several allodial estates.

The domain of the Agoult-Simiane family appears to have consisted primarily of allodial lands, that is, properties held free of seigneurial obligations, located around Apt (in present-day Vaucluse) from the 10th century onward. Their possessions lay mainly to the north of the county of Apt, where they controlled several fortified sites (castra) on the Viens plateau, including Viens and Alpester, as well as Caseneuve, and Castillon, where a monastery known as the monasteriolum of Saint Martin was established. To the northeast, their influence extended over the Albion plateau, including Sault, Simiane, and Banon. To the west, along the boundary between the counties of Apt and Cavaillon, they held the castra of Goult and Gordes, as well as the villae of Beaumettes and Sorguette. The establishment and maintenance of this territorial control involved conflicts, notably with the Castellane-Lacoste family, allies of the viscounts of Cavaillon. The earliest documented reference to this rivalry dates from the act of 992.

The historian Jean Barruo, in his study L'influence de saint Mayeul et de ses proches dans la renaissance du XIe siècle, associated several landholding families of Apt and its surrounding region with the lineage of Saint Maiolus of Cluny. Building on this work, Jean Méhu traced this lineage back to Fulcher the Elder, the grandfather of Saint Mayeul, through Fulcher's younger son Eyric. In this interpretation, Imbert (or Humbert I) is identified as one of the five sons of Eyric, brother of Mayeul. According to this hypothesis, the estates held by these families would have originated from the extensive patrimony of Fulcher the Elder, a major landowner of Gallo-Roman origin who, by the mid-8th century, possessed numerous villae in Provence, particularly in the pagi of Riez, Sisteron, Fréjus, Apt, and Venasque.

The medievalist Eliana Magnani questioned this analysis, considering the proposed connections to be uncertain. She argued that although the Agoult family held property in Apt, these possessions were not necessarily inherited and may instead have been acquired through later appropriation.

=== Cognomina ===
In a study on naming practices and the transmission of power in the Provençal aristocracy, Florian Mazel, building on earlier work by Poly, observes that the earliest members of the Agoult family adopted toponymic surnames only from the 12th century, relatively late compared with the emergence of castral lordships. He notes that the cognomen “d’Agoult,” which became hereditary, is attested from the early 12th century, with its earliest known occurrence dating to 1094.

During the mid-11th century, family members were initially identified by the toponymic surname “d’Apt.” This designation was soon replaced by “d’Agoult,” and from 1126 onward by “de Simiane.”

In the main line, some members used the cognomen “de Simiane” in addition to “d’Agoult.” A lesser-known secondary branch adopted the cognomen “de Viens” and became extinct in the 13th century.

According to Mazel, the spread of hereditary surnames did not immediately end the reuse of paternal given names. This practice continued during the 12th century and gradually stabilized in the 13th century in the form of compound names, combining the individual's given name with that of the father.

The lineage name (Leitname) Imbert, used by the earliest generations, gradually disappeared, except within a secondary branch. From the beginning of the 12th century, new given names became established within the family, notably Raimbaud, Guiran, Bertran, Rostaing, and Raimon. Mazel notes that the cognomen “d’Agoult” is attested only in association with the given names Rostaing, Raimon, and Raimbaud, whereas “de Simiane” is associated exclusively with Guiran, despite the fact that seigneurial rights over the castra of Goult and Simiane continued to be exercised jointly by different branches of the family.

=== Rise of the family ===
The rise of the Agoult family began around the early 11th century with its establishment in Apt. The family appears to have supported Church reform, although Mazel emphasizes that this may have been part of a broader strategy in its power struggle with other aristocratic families. Their possessions, combined with an alliance with Raimbaud of Nice (Raimbaud of Reillanne) from the viscountal lineage of Nice-Orange, enabled the family to assume a protective role over the Church of Apt. Early members were integrated into the count's entourage and exercised influence over the episcopatus of Apt.

Guillem (or Guillaume) I (died c. 1035) married Azalaïs (or Adélaïde), likely of Reillanne. Their son, Alfant, became bishop of Apt in early 1048, under the support of Raimbaud of Nice. Several family members participated in the reconstruction of the cathedral, establishing it as a significant religious institution.

In 1056, Alfant's brothers, Rostaing (or Rostang) and Guillaume, co-lords of Apt, donated the monastery of Saint Peter to the cathedral.

Rostaing (1031–late 11th century) married, in a second marriage, Gisla (or Gisle), daughter of Raimbaud of Nice. Their son, Laugier, later succeeded his uncle as bishop of Apt.

=== 12th–13th century: emergence of the branches ===
The Agoult-Simiane family gave rise to several branches.

Raimbaud, son of Rostaing (or Rostang), married Sancia (or Sancie), Lady of Simiane. Their son, Guiran (or Guirand), adopted the name of Simiane and founded the Simiane branch. A second son, Bertrand, is considered the possible father of Raimon (or Raymond), a knight and lord of Agoult and the valley of Sault, from whom this lineage is documented.

Raimon (or Raymond), whose lineage is documented, married Isoarde, daughter of Isoard II, count of Die. In July 1178, he attended the coronation of Emperor Frederick Barbarossa as King of Burgundy in Arles. Following this event, he received an imperial charter confirming his feudal jurisdiction over the valley of Sault and recognizing his rights to collect tolls by land and water within the county of Die. The couple had three sons: Raimon (or Raymond) II of Agoult, Bertrand I of Mison, and Isnard I of Entrevennes. Isnard founded the senior branch of the family in Provence, while Raimon II established a branch known as the lords of Beaurières in Dauphiné.

In 1182, Raimbaud of Agoult transferred the castles of Montfort, Arnoux, and Peyruis, along with his possessions in the diocese of Sisteron, to William IV, count of Forcalquier, in exchange for a guarantee of 5,000 sous.

Mabille of Agoult, known as of Entrevennes, married Bergundio (or Burgundion), a member of the viscountal family of Marseille and lord of Trets and Ollières. Their son, Isnard, adopted his mother's name and arms, founding the Agoult d’Ollières family.

At the beginning of the 13th century, a branch of the Agoult family settled in the region of Sisteron (Mison), giving rise to the Agoult family of Dauphiné. By the early 17th century, this family became established in the Grenoble region through marriage. Hector of Agoult, Baron of Montmaur and councillor at the Parliament of Dauphiné, married Uranie, the granddaughter of Soffrey de Calignon, chancellor to the King of Navarre. The Dauphiné branches were divided into three main lines: Agoult-Montmaur, which became extinct with Count Charles Louis Constant d’Agoult (1790–1875); the Voreppe branch, including its offshoots of La Varenne and Beauplan, which became extinct with Hector d’Agoult (1860–1915); and the Beauvesin branch, which became extinct in 1837.

The Agoult family became extinct in the male line in 1915 with the death of Hector d’Agoult, deputy for Senegal. He had married Valentine d’Estampes in 1891 and had three sons, who died in early childhood, and one daughter, Clémentine (1897–1991). In 1924, Clémentine married Antoine, Baron Séguier (1891–1978). In 1963, their three sons were authorized to resume the Agoult name, resulting in the combined surname Séguier d’Agoult.

== Coat of arms ==
The arms of the Agoult family are blazoned as follows:

Or, a wolf rampant azure.

Or, a wolf ravissant azure, armed, langued, and vilené gules.

The shield is enveloped in a mantle of a Peer of France. Crown: that of a Prince on the shield and that of a Marquis (or Viscount) on the mantle.

Motto: Avidus committere pugnam (eager to engage in battle).

War cry: Sault au seigneur.

A 12th-century forged document claims that the first progenitor of the House, named Loup (Wolf), son of a princess, was raised by a she-wolf and received the arms and lands of the valley of Sault from Emperor Henry II.

King René of Anjou, ruler of Naples, Duke of Anjou and Lorraine, and Count of Provence, assigned the nickname “Hospitality of Agoult” to the family. He similarly gave nicknames to twenty-seven other aristocratic families of Provence, including the “Liberality of Villeneuve,” the “Gravity of Arcussia,” the “Greatness of the Porcellets,” and the “Fidelity of Bouliers.”

=== Branches ===
- Agoult of Voreppe (Dauphiné): Or, a wolf ravissant azure, armed, langued, and vilené gules; with a chief of the same, charged with a silver cross.

== Filiation of the Agoult-Simiane ==
Presentation of the lineage of the first Agoult-Simiane, according to the work of the medievalist Florian Mazel. The dates correspond to the first and last mentions in the documentation:

- Imbert/Humbert I (992–1009), married to Inaurs (1009–1031).
  - Guillem/Guillaume I (1009–d. c. 1035), married to Azalaïs/Adélaïde of Reillanne (1019–1045).
    - Rostaing/Rostang I (1031 – late 11th century), married (1) to Constancia/Constance (1010–c. 1032), then (2) to Gisla/Gisle of Nice-Orange (c. 1032–c. 1060).
      - Imbert/Humbert III of Agoult (c. 1050/65–1096), ancestor of the Viens branch, married to Lamarsanna of Châteaurenard.
        - Imbert/Humbert IV of Viens (1193–1201), married to an unnamed spouse.
          - Raimonda.
          - Guiran II of Viens, bishop of Apt (1184–d. before 1208).
        - Fratres (1193).
      - Raimbaud I (c. 1050/80–d. before 1113), married to Sancia/Sancie of Forcalquier.
        - Guiran I of Simiane (1120–1177), married to Aselmoïs.
          - Raimbaud Guiran (1173–d. before 1215), married to Tiburgis of Orange.
          - Imbert/Humbert V, canon of Apt.
        - Bertran Raimbaud (1120–d. c. 1191/95), married to Sacristana Porcelet.
          - Raimon II.
        - Rostaing III (c. 1120–1178/79), married to an unnamed spouse of Mison-Entrevennes.
          - Raimbaud II (1172–d. c. 1190/98), married to Chauza/Sancia.
          - Beatrix, married to Raimon Laugier of Mévouillon.
        - Guillem/Guillaume IV (1155/77–1202?), married to an unnamed spouse of Rians.
        - Sancia.
        - Sons and daughters.
      - Raimon I (c. 1050/80–late 11th century).
      - Laugier/Léger (c. 1050/65–d. after 1125), bishop of Apt (1103–1143).
      - Guillem/Guillaume III (c. 1050/80), troubadour.
      - Rostaing/Rostang II (c. 1050/80).
      - Daughters:
      - Bertran, monk of Lérins.
    - Guillem/Guillaume II (1031–c. 1056/60).
    - Inaurs, alias Pietas (1031–1045), married in 1045 to Uc/Hugues I des Baux.
    - Constancia/Constance (1031–after 1032).
    - Alfant/Aufant (c. 1030/32–1076), bishop of Apt (1048–1076).
  - Imbert/Humbert II (1019).

== Filiation of the Agoult ==
According to Gustave Chaix d’Est-Ange, the Chevalier de Courcelles presented a complete genealogy in volume VII of Histoire généalogique des pairs de France. An excerpt from a memorandum by Chérin, who was responsible for verifying proofs of nobility under Louis XVI to allow access to court honors, presents a documented lineage beginning with Raymond, who is considered likely to have been the son of Bertrand.

- Raimbaud, married to Sancia/Sancie, known as Lady of Simiane.
  - Guiran/Guirand of Agoult, who took the name of Simiane,
    - from whom descends the Simiane family.
  - Bertrand, lord of Agoult, co-lord of Apt, of Gordes, etc.
    - Raimon/Raymond, knight, lord of Agoult and of the valley of Sault, married in 1160 to Isoarde, daughter of Isoard II, count of Die, from whom:
      - Isnard I, known as of Entrevennes, baron of Sault, co-lord of Agoult, of Apt, etc., founder of the Provençal branch, married around 1210 to Doulce/Doulceline de Pontevès.
        - Fouquet/Foulques I, lord of Pontevès through his mother,
          - given as the founder of the second Pontevès family (not consensual).
          - Barral I of Pontevès.
        - Isnard II of Agoult, baron of Sault, married around 1242 to Béatrix de Rians.
          - Isnard III of Agoult, called “the Great.”
            - Raymond II of Agoult, baron of Sault, governor of Marseille, seneschal of the counties of Provence and Forcalquier (1348).
              - “It became extinct with Raymond V of Agoult, baron of Sault, who had no children from his marriage to Blanche de Tournon and who, by his will of 12 April 1503, bequeathed the barony of Sault to his sister Louise.”
                - Louise, married to Claude de Montauban, baron of Saint-André (Dauphiné).
                  - Louis de Montauban, baron of Sault, married in 1527 to Blanche de Lévis-Ventadour, took the name of Agoult.
                    - ?
                      - François-Louis d’Agoult de Montauban (d. 1608), count of Sault, knight of the King's Orders (1585).
                        - with descendants.
        - Raymond, lord of Trets, married to Galburge de Sabran, lady of Forcalquier,
          - “founder of a branch whose last representative, Raymond d’Agoult, lord of Trets and of Forcalquier, made his will in 1378 and had only daughters.”
        - Mabille, known as of Entrevennes, married to Bergundio/Burgundion/Burgundius, viscount of Marseille, lord of Trets and of Ollières.
          - Isnard of Ollières, “substituted his mother’s name for his own and was the founder of the Agoult d’Ollières family, which became extinct in the 17th century.”
      - Raimon/Raymond II of Agoult, founder of the Dauphiné branch.
      - Bertrand I of Mison.
        - ?
          - Amelin/Amiel, lord of Curban, Monestier, and Claret, seneschal of the counties of Provence and Forcalquier (1272),
            - “whose lineage became extinct in the person of Albanette d’Agoult, lady of Curban, married in 1449 to her cousin, Guillaume d’Agoult, lord of Barret, from the senior branch.”

== Personalities ==
=== Middle Ages ===
- Seneschals of the counties of Provence and Forcalquier:
  - 1263: Pierre Deviens (of Viens), of the House of Simiane;
  - 1272: Amelin d’Agoult, lord of Curbans and Claret;
  - 1348: Raymond d’Agoult, removed from office by Queen Joanna;
  - 1352: Raymond d’Agoult, his son;
  - 1353, 1354, 1355: Fouque d’Agoult, lord of Sault, Reillanne, and Le Luc;
  - 1358, 1359: Raymond d’Agoult;
  - 1363–1365; 1377–1384, 1385: Fouque d’Agoult, marquis of Corfu, lord of Sault, Reillanne, and Le Luc;
  - 1369: Raymond d’Agoult-Sault.
- Fouquet/Foulques d’Agoult, chamberlain and counselor to King René of Anjou (Provence), 15th century.

=== Renaissance ===
- Joseph d’Agoult (16th century), took part in the massacre of the Waldensians of the Luberon.
- François d’Agoult-Montauban (1528–1567), Governor of Lyonnais, first count of Sault in 1561.
  - François-Louis d’Agout (1558–1586), second count of Sault in 1561, of Montlaur, baron of Grimaud, lord of Savigny-sur-Orge, married to Chrétienne d’Aguerre (1553–1611), heiress countess of Sault in 1586, from whom the title passed to the descendants of Chrétienne d’Aguerre's first marriage to Antoine de Blanchefort de Créqui.

=== 18th century ===
- Pierre Nicolas d’Agoult (1733–1801), French general.
- Louis Annibal de Saint-Michel d’Agoult (1747–1810), French general.
- Joseph-Mathieu d’Agoult (1749–1824), bishop of Pamiers.
- Louis-Fouquet de Vincens de Saint-Michel d’Agoult (1737–1813).
- Antoine-Jean d’Agoult (1750–1828), assistant major-general of the King's bodyguards, King's musketeer, artillery lieutenant, colonel of the 3rd Legion of Foreign Volunteers of the Navy, lieutenant general, governor of Saint-Cloud, peer of France, Knight of the Order of the Holy Spirit, officer of the Legion of Honor, Grand Cross of Saint Louis, commander of Saint Lazarus and Our Lady of Mount Carmel.
- Jean Antoine, count d’Agoult (1753–1826), lord of Voreppe, King's bodyguard, deputy of the Dauphiné nobility to the Estates General of 1789, officer of the Legion of Honor, commander of Saint Louis.
- Marie Justine Angélique d’Agoult (1767–1818), divorced in 1793 from François-Édouard, marquis d’Agoult (1746–1837), and daughter of François de Vachon de Briançon de Belmont.

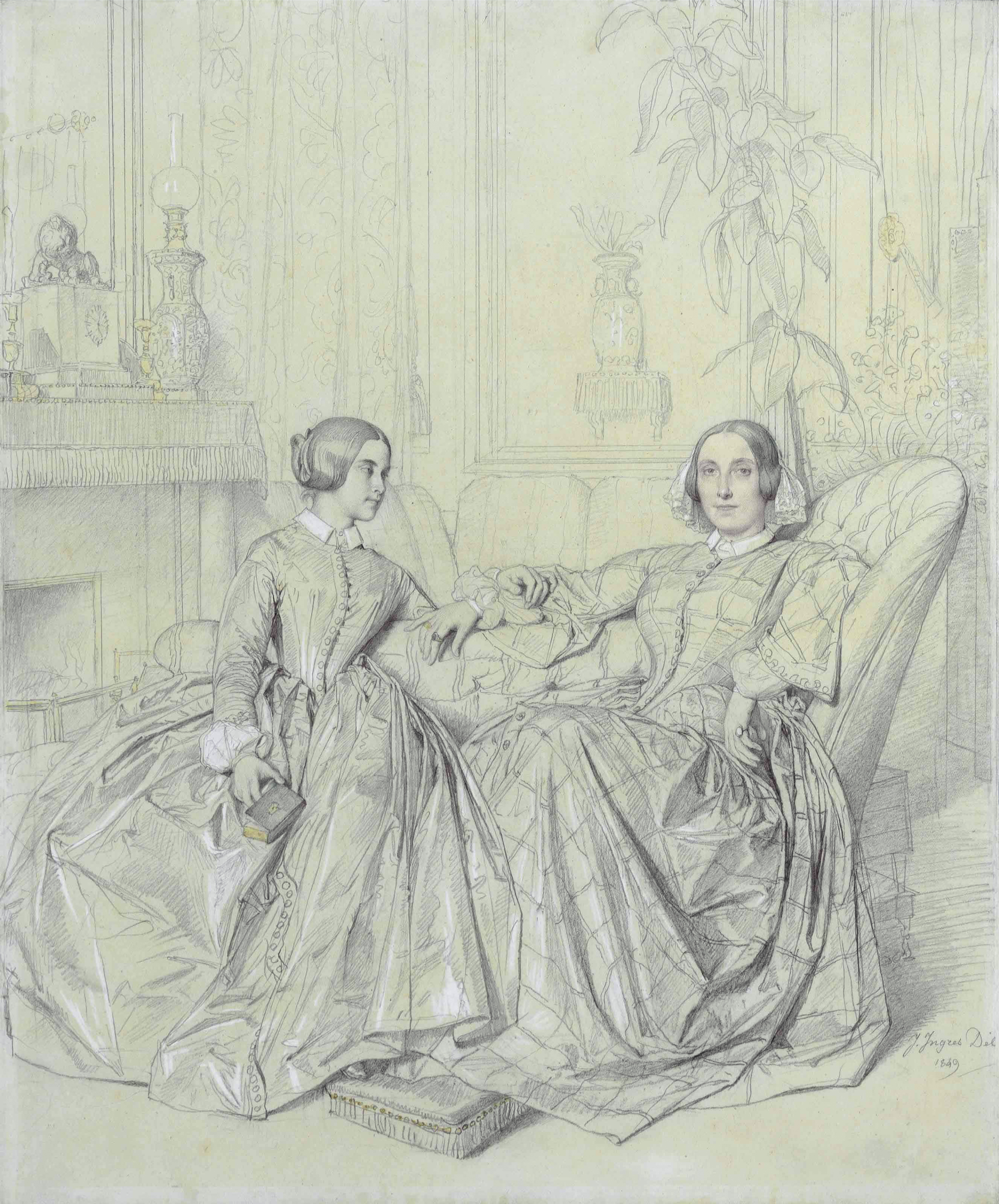
Countess Charles d'Agoult, born Marie de Flavigny (also known as Daniel Stern), and her daughter Claire d'Agoult (1849), by Jean-Auguste-Dominique Ingres.

=== 19th century ===
- Graduate of the Special Military School of Saint-Cyr, colonel commanding the 1st Hussar Regiment. Commander of the Legion of Honor. Knight of the Order of Saint Gregory the Great.
- Charles Louis Constant d’Agoult (1790–1875), cavalry colonel, first equerry to Madame the Dauphine, and his wife Marie d’Agoult (1805–1876), born Marie de Flavigny, French writer also known under the pseudonym Daniel Stern, companion of Franz Liszt.
- Claire Christine d’Agoult (1830–1912), marchioness of Charnacé and daughter of Charles Louis Constant d’Agoult and Marie d’Agoult, was a French writer and journalist.
- Hector-Philippe d’Agoult (1782–1856), count d’Agoult, lord of Beauplan, diplomat, ambassador to the Netherlands and Germany.
- Hector d’Agoult (1860–1915), count d’Agoult, lord of Beauplan, naval officer, deputy for Senegal, last male of his name.

== Branches ==
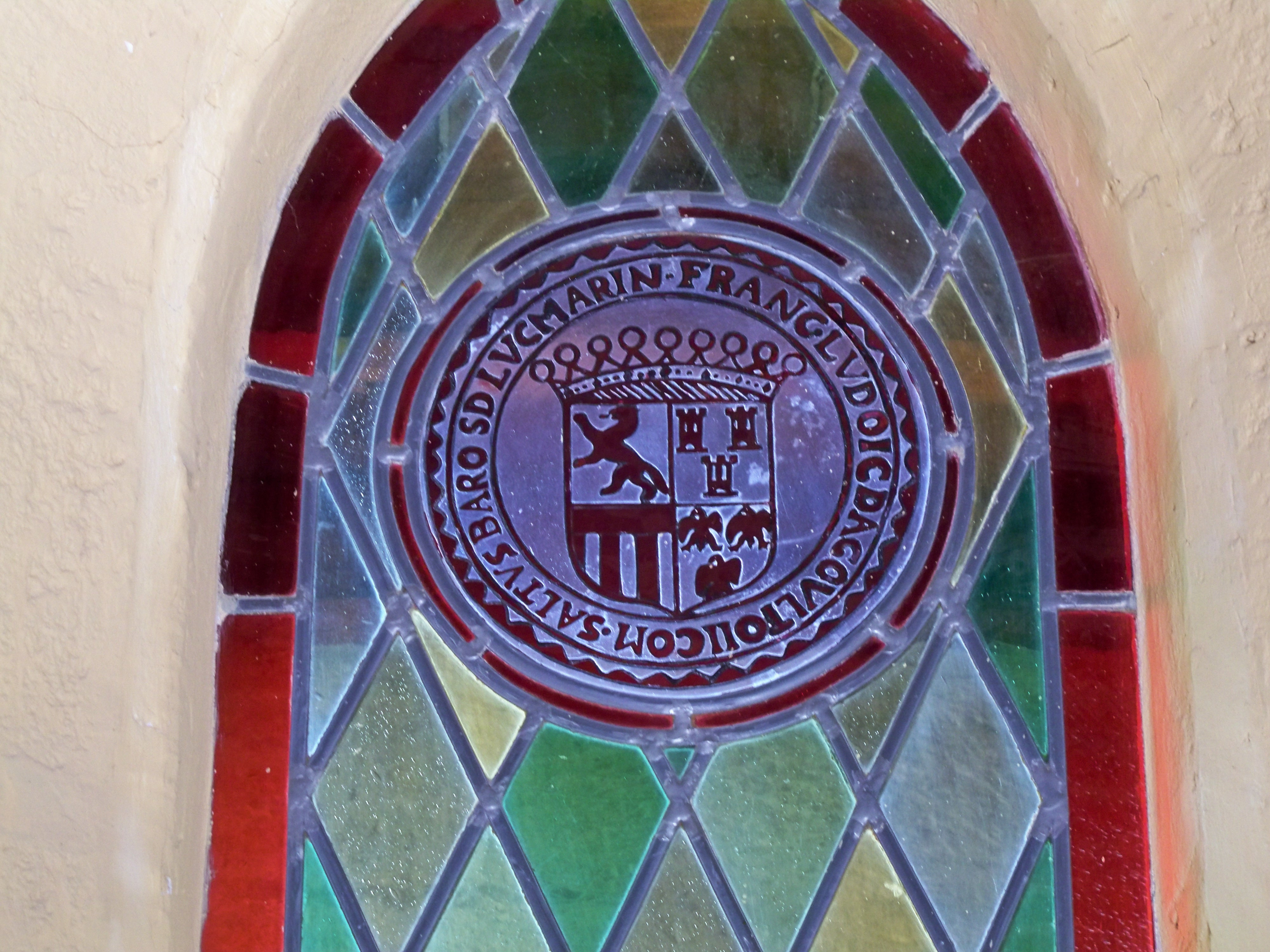
Coat of arms of the Agoult family, Counts of Sault, at the Château de Lourmarin.

The Agoult family gave rise to the following branches:

- Agoult-Sault
- Agoult-Château-Arnoux
- Agoult de Luc-en-Diois
- Agoult des Beaumettes
- Agoult-Mison
- Agoult-Upaix
- Agoult-Curbans
- Agoult-Montauban
- Agoult-Bonneval
- Agoult-Chanousse
- Agoult-Montmaur
- Agoult-Voreppe
- Agoult-Beauvesin
- Agoult-Beauplan
- Agoult-Saint-Auban
- Agoult-Angles
- Félix d’Agoult
- Flotte d’Agoult
- Séguier d’Agoult

- Agoult d’Ollières, arising from the union between Mabille d’Agoult and Bergundio/Burgundion/Burgundius, from the vicomital family of Marseille.
- Vincens d’Agoult, a family in which Fouquet Vincent adopted the name and arms of his godfather, Fouquet d’Agoult.

== Bibliography ==
=== Recent publications ===
- Magnani, Eliana (1999). Monastères et aristocratie en Provence - milieu Xe - début XIIe siècle [Monasteries and the aristocracy in Provence - mid-10th to early 12th century]. Vita Regularis. Ordnungen und Deutungen religiosen Leben im Mittelalter (in French). Vol. 10. Lit Verlag. ISBN 3-8258-3663-0.
- Mazel, Florian (2002). La noblesse et l'Église en Provence, fin Xe – début XIVe siècle. L'exemple des familles d'Agoult-Simiane, de Baux et de Marseille [The nobility and the Church in Provence, late 10th–early 14th century. The example of the families of Agoult-Simiane, Baux, and Marseille] (in French). Paris: CTHS. ISBN 2-7355-0503-0.
  - Mazel, Florian (2000). La noblesse et l'Église en Provence, fin Xe – début XIVe siècle. L'exemple des familles d'Agoult-Simiane, de Baux et de Marseille [The nobility and the Church in Provence, late 10th–early 14th century. The example of the families of Agoult-Simiane, Baux, and Marseille] (Thesis) (in French). Vol. 4. Université d'Aix-Marseille.
- Mazel, Florian (2000b). "Réforme de l'Église et domination urbaine : aux origines de l'hégémonie des Agoult-Simiane en pays d'Apt (XIe – XIIe siècles av. J.-C.)" [Church reform and urban domination: the origins of the Agoult-Simiane hegemony in the Apt region (11th–12th centuries BC)]. Religion et société urbaine au Moyen-Age (in French): 43–68. ISBN 2859443924.
- Méhu, Jean (2008). "Chapitre 16 - Le premier Moyen Age" [Chapter 16 - The Early Middle Ages]. Histoire du Lubéron [History of the Luberon] (PDF) (in French).
- Verdon, Laure (2013). "Le couple, stratégie d'identité et de perpétuation des lignages (Provence, Xe – XIIe siècles av. J.-C.). Réflexions à partir de l'exemple des Agoult" [The couple, a strategy for identity and perpetuating lineages (Provence, 10th–12th centuries BC). Reflections based on the example of the Agoults]. Médiévales (in French). 65 (65): 109–124. doi:10.4000/medievales.7117.

=== Old books ===
- Unknown. Généalogie de la maison d'Agout [Genealogy of the House of Agout] (in French). pp. 70–80.
- Chaix d'Est-Ange, Gustave (1922). Dictionnaire des familles françaises anciennes ou notables à la fin du XIXe siècle. t. XVIII Fel-For [Dictionary of Old or Notable French Families at the End of the 19th Century. Vol. XVIII Fel-For] (in French). Évreux: C. Hérissey. pp. 381–386.
- Jougla de Morenas, Henri; de Warren, Raoul (1952). Grand armorial de France. t.1 A-Bataillon [Great Armorial of France. Vol. 1 A-Bataillon] (PDF) (in French). Évreux: Société du Grand armorial de France. p. 124.
- Morand, Jean-Louis (1987). Gordes, notes d'histoire [Gordes, historical notes] (in French). Gordes.
- de Rivoire de La Bâtie, Gustave (1969). Armorial de Dauphiné : contenant les armoiries figurées de toutes les familles nobles et notables de cette province, accompagnées de notices généalogiques complétant les nobiliaires de Chorier et de Guy Allard [Armorial of Dauphiné: containing the coats of arms of all the noble and notable families of this province, accompanied by genealogical notes supplementing the nobility lists of Chorier and Guy Allard.] (in French). Lyon: Imprimerie Louis Perrin. pp. 3–4.
- Poly, Jean-Pierre (1976). La Provence et la société féodale : 879-1166, contribution à l'étude des structures dites féodales dans le Midi [Provence and feudal society: 879-1166, contribution to the study of so-called feudal structures in the Midi region] (in French). Paris: Bordas.
