= Francisco Espoz y Mina =

Spanish guerrilla leader and general

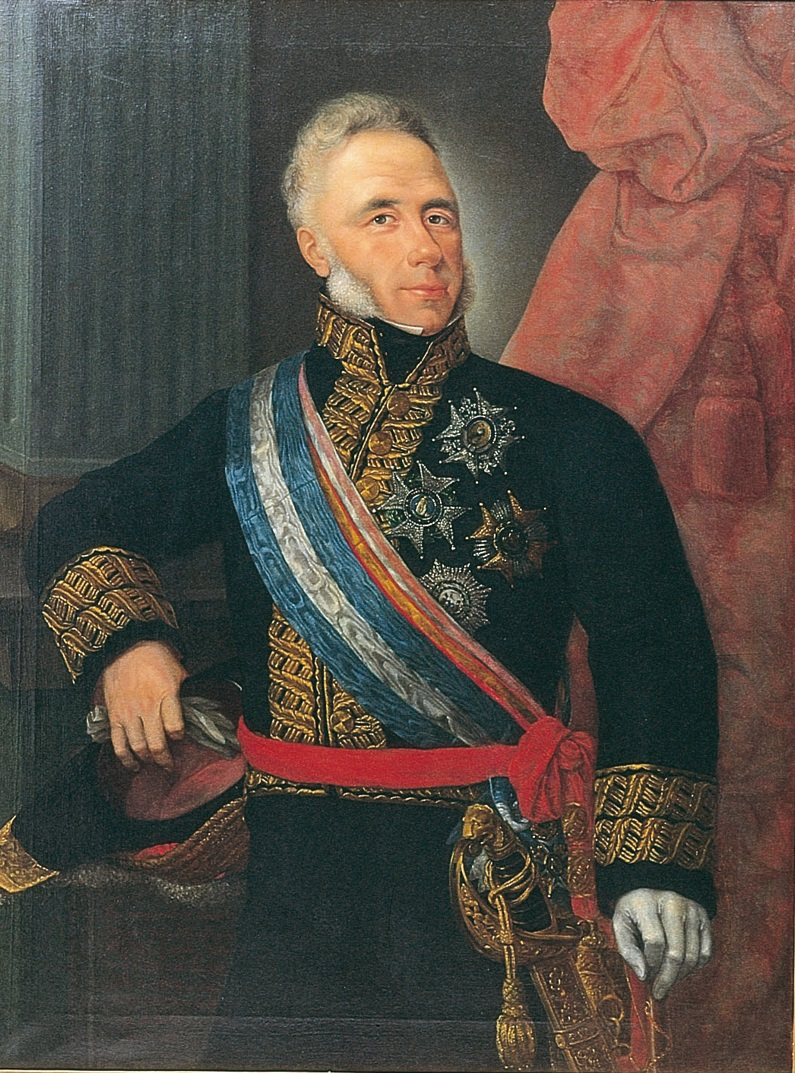
- Portrait of General Espoz y Mina by José Vallespin
- Born: 17 June 1781; Idocin, Navarre
- Died: 24 December 1836 (aged 55) Barcelona, Catalonia
- Allegiance: Spain
- Conflicts: Peninsular War

Francisco Espoz y Mina Ilundáin (Note: Referred to in the Spanish literature, and by Oman (Oman 1908, pp. 116, 286), by his first surname, Espoz y Mina, or simply Espoz (Cassinello op. cit.) to distinguish him from his nephew, Francisco Javier Mina y Larrea, who is normally referred to as Javier, or Xavier Mina. Oman, on occasion, also lapses into the simple 'Mina' when referring to the former (Oman 1908, 490–491.).) (1781–1836) was a Spanish guerrilla leader and general.

Espoz y Mina is considered the most important guerrillero of the Peninsular War for three reasons: by positioning himself so close to the French forces and their lines of communication he was able to harass them continuously; the direct outcome of his field of operations, which limited the resources the French army could deploy elsewhere; and because, unlike many other guerrilleros, he did not resort to plundering the villages within his domain. Rather, he set up a civil administration with which he was able to finance, arm and feed his considerable forces, as well as using the booty he obtained from French convoys he captured. He even demanded a tax on French goods entering the country, and the French custom-house at Irun paid his delegates 100 gold ounces per month.

Marshal Drouet, Comte d'Erlon deployed a whole division from his IX Corps to hunt him down during the autumn of 1810, resulting in the non-appearance of the Corps at Ciudad Rodrigo and Salamanca, when Marshal Masséna was anxiously awaiting its arrival. In all, during the months of September, October, and November, 38,000 men under Drouet, Roguet, Dumoustier, and Reille were prevented by Espoz y Mina's actions from doing anything to help Masséna.

== Biography ==
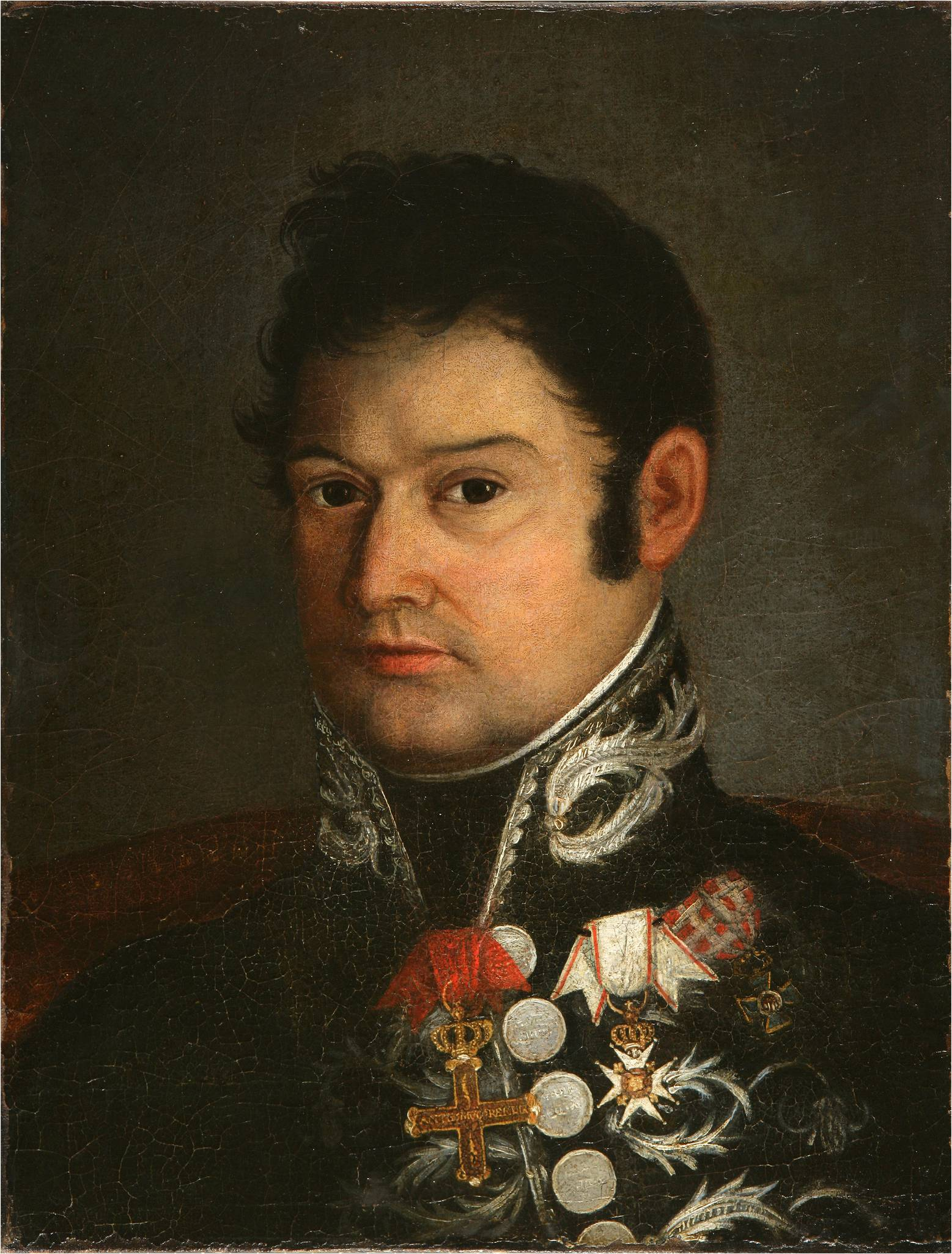
Francisco Espoz y Mina

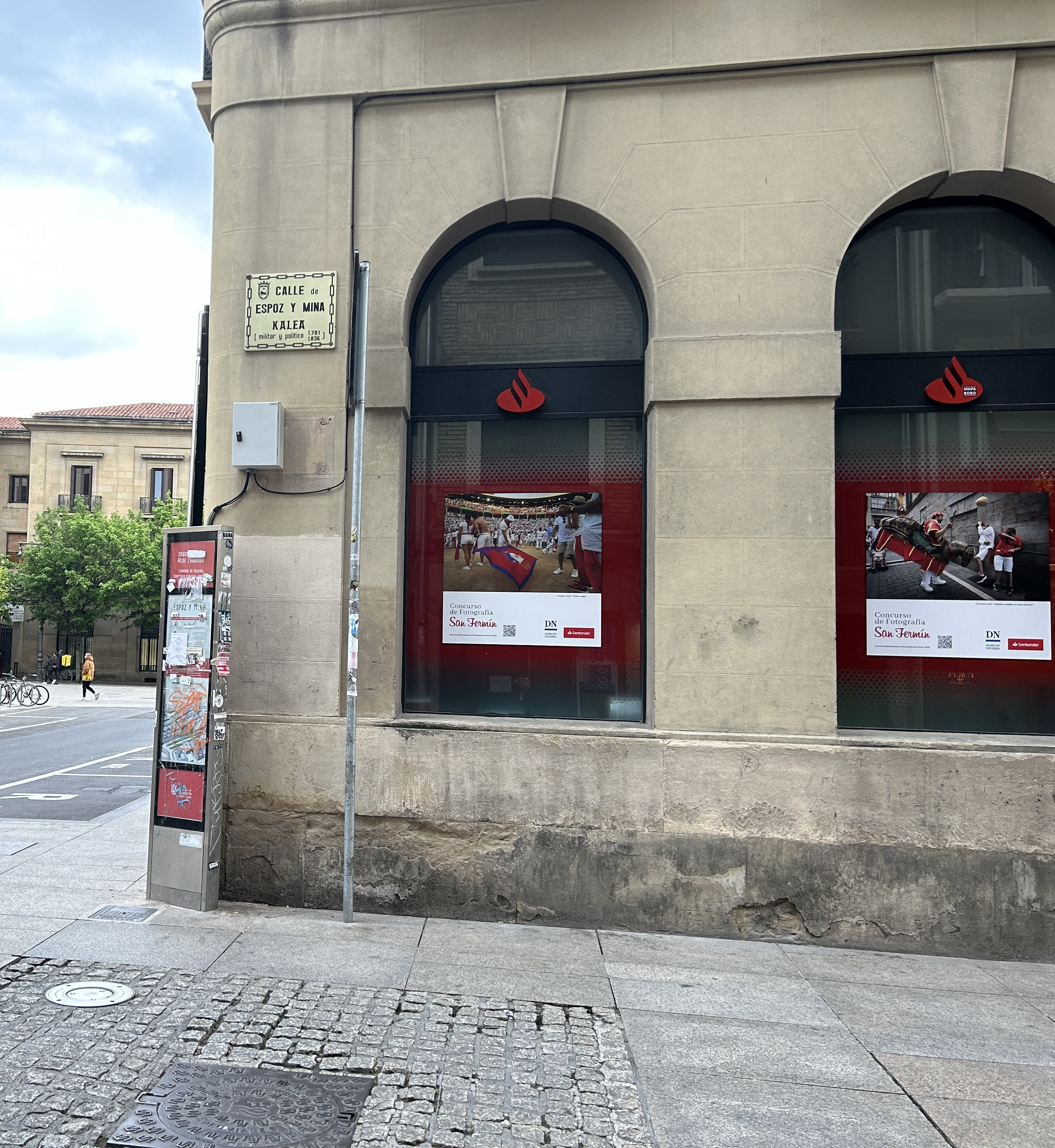
Street in the name of Espoz y Mina in Pamplona.

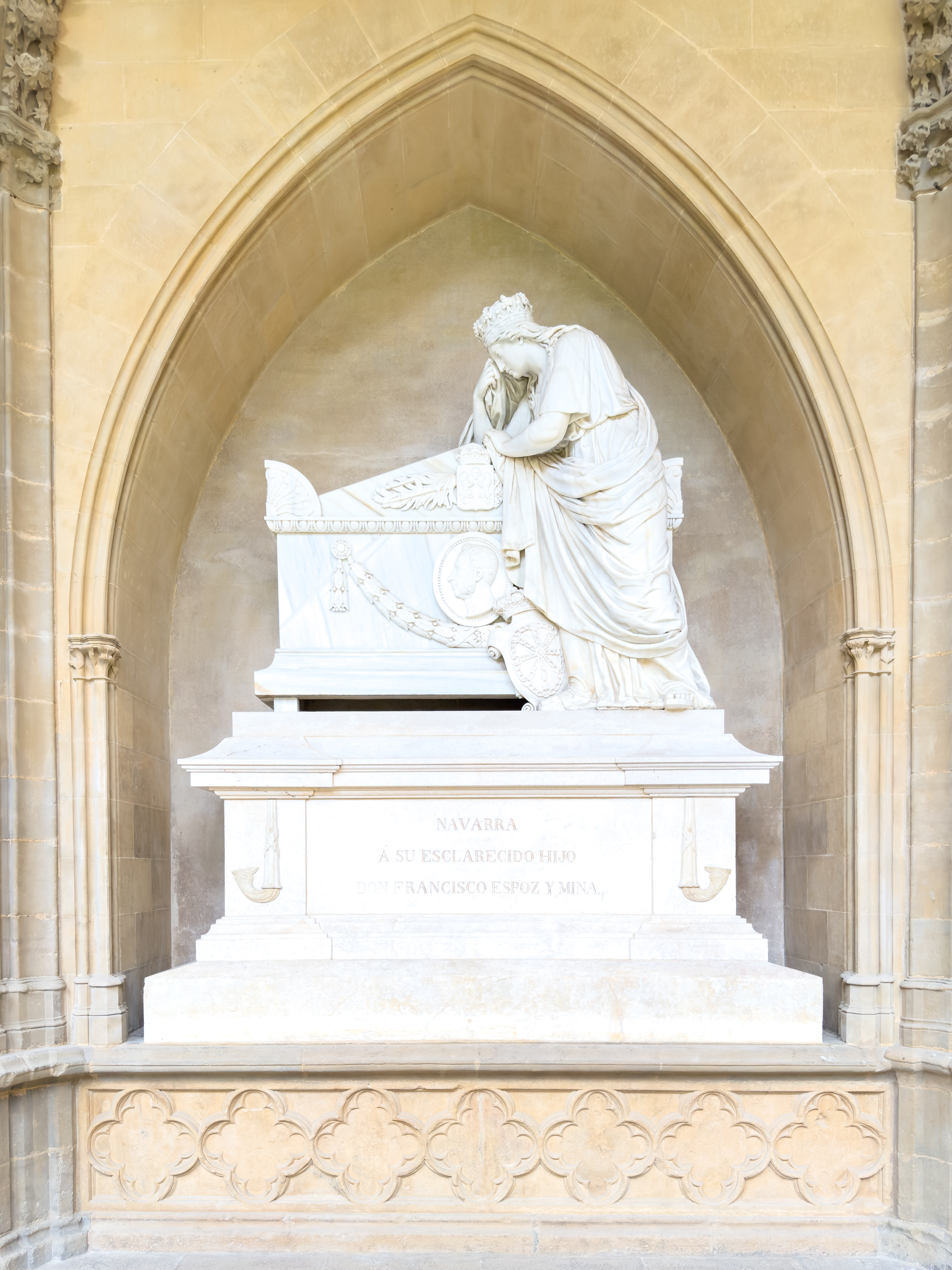
Tomb in the cloister of Pamplona Cathedral (1855).

He was born in Idocin in Navarre. His father, Juan Esteban Espoz y Mina, and his mother, Maria Teresa Ilundáin y Ardaiz, were yeomen, rural smallholders, and Francisco Espoz worked on the small family farm until 1808.

Espoz enlisted in Doyle's regiment at Jaca in February 1809, and when Jaca was taken the following month, he managed to escape and joined the guerrilla group commanded by his nephew Francisco Javier Mina. When the latter was captured on 21 March 1810, six or seven men of the group chose to follow Francisco Espoz, and on 1 April 1810, the Junta of Aragon gave him the command of the guerrilleros of Navarre.

The following July, at Estella, he captured and shot Echevarria, who, under the pretence of being a guerrillero, was in fact a brigand. Echevarria's 600-foot and 200 horse then joined Espoz's men.

Despite Espoz's petition to the Regency to be given official command of the Navarran guerrillas, Francisco Javier de Irujo, the prior of Ujué, was chosen instead, as well as being given a million reales for that purpose. When Irujo appeared with his authorisation in May 1810, Espoz accepted it. However, when the prior abandoned the field of combat at Estella, Espoz y Mina was able to regain his command, and by September, the Regency had promoted him to the rank of colonel and Commandant-General of all the Guerrilleros of Navarre, at that time made up of three Infantry battalions and a squadron of hussars.

Though some maintain that he was not at his best as a leader in battle, as a strategist, Espoz y Mina was very successful and displayed great organizing capacity. The French authorities were compelled to allow him to levy customs dues on all goods imported into Spain, except contraband of war, which he would not allow to pass without fighting. The money thus obtained was used to pay his bands a regular salary. He was able to avoid levying excessive contributions on the country and to maintain discipline among his men, whom he had brought to a respectable state of efficiency in 1812. Espoz y Mina claimed that he had immobilized 26,000 French troops, which would, but for him, have served with Marshal Marmont at Salamanca. In the campaign of 1813 and 1814 he served with distinction under Field Marshal Wellesley, the future Duke of Wellington.

In the interval, he claimed that he had fought 143 actions big and little, had been repeatedly wounded by bullet, sword and lance, had taken 13 fortified posts, and 14,000 prisoners, and had never been surprised by the French.

Apart from the attempts by Drouet's division during the autumn of 1810, later, and simultaneously, six French generals, with 18,000 men, were actively engaged in trying to put an end to Espoz's operations: Dorsenne, the governor of Burgos; Marshal Reille in Navarre; Caffarelli and his division of Reserve of the Army of Spain, by D'Agoult, the governor of Pamplona; Roguet, and Paris, one of Suchet's brigadiers from the Army of Aragon.

After the restoration of Ferdinand VII, he fell into disfavour. On 25/26 September, he attempted to bring about an uprising at Pamplona in favour of the Liberal party, but failed, and went into exile. His political opinions were democratic and radical, and as a yeoman, he disliked the hidalgos (low-ranking nobles). The Revolution of 1820 brought him back, and he served the Liberal party during the Trienio Liberal in Galicia, Leon and Catalonia. In this last region, he made the only vigorous resistance to the French intervention in favour of Ferdinand VII. On 1 November 1823, he capitulated, and the French allowed him to escape to England by sea. In 1830, he took part in an unsuccessful rising against Ferdinand.

In 1825, Espoz y Mina published A Short Extract from the Life of General Mina, in Spanish and English, in London. Mention is made of him in all histories of the affairs of Spain during the first third of the 19th century.

On the death of the king, he was recalled to Spain, and the government of the regent Christina gave him the command against the Carlists in 1835, though they feared his Radicalism. By this time, years of exposure and wounds had undermined his health. He was also opposed to Tomás de Zumalacárregui, an old officer of his in the War of Independence, and an even greater master of irregular mountain warfare. His health compelled him to resign in April 1835, and his later command in Catalonia was only memorable for the part he took in forcing the regent to grant a constitution in August 1836. He died in Barcelona on 24 December 1836.

His full Memoirs were published by his widow at Madrid in 1851–52.

The Plaza de Mina in Cádiz, Spain, is named after him.
