= Auspicius =

Auspicius may refer to one of several Catholic saints:

- Auspicius of Apt, traditionally given as the first bishop of Apt, end of 1st century, said to have preserved the relics of Saint Anne
- Auspicius of Toul, bishop of Toul at the end of the fifth century
- Auspicius of Trier, Archbishop of Trier c. 131, who is perhaps to be identified with Auspicius of Toul
