= Antoine de Béthencourt =

Portuguese army general (1759–1801)

- Born: 29 October 1759; Santa Cruz, Madeira
- Died: 6 August 1801 (aged 41) Pointe-à-Pitre, Guadeloupe
- Allegiance: Portugal (until 1780) France
- Branch: French Army
- Service years: 1772-1801
- Rank: Général de brigade
- Commands: Tarn's National Volunteers, Army of the Eastern Pyrenees, Seine-Inférieure, Mayenne, colonial troops on Guadeloupe
- Conflicts: French Revolutionary Wars, (1800) Italian Campaign

Antoine de Béthencourt (29 October 1759 - 6 August 1801) was a Portuguese general in French service during the French Revolutionary Wars.

== Life ==
Born in Santa Cruz, Madeira, he became a cadet in the infantry company of the Présidio of Madeira in 1772, rising to captain eight years later. He moved to France in 1780 and served in its National Guard in Tarn. He was made a lieutenant colonel in Tarn's National Volunteers on 4 October 1792 and a chef de brigade in the Army of the Eastern Pyrenees in May 1793.

In June 1793 he was put in command of the Army's vanguard and on 5 September the same year was promoted to général de brigade. He served in d'Aoust's division from 5 to 23 December before being dismissed for being of noble stock. That sentence was confirmed on 10 January 1794 when he and sixteen other generals of that Army were arrested by representatives Milhaud and Soubrany. A revolutionary tribunal in Perpignan acquitted him that same month but he was arrested as a noble again and imprisoned in Perpignan's Castillet.

Freed and returned to the army in May 1795, he commanded Oise before in June being sent to the Army of the Coasts of Cherbourg. That September he moved to the Army of the Interior, commanding the departments of Seine-Inférieure and Eure from October 1795 until February 1800, when he was transferred to the Army of the West. There he commanded Mayenne before being sent to the reserves of the Army of Italy to command Vaufreland and oversee the crossing of the Simplon Pass.

He fought in the 1800 Italy campaign, commanding a division which entered Italy through the Simplon Pass on 26 and 27 May that year. He occupied Domodossola on 28 May, laid siege to Arona, Piedmont on 31 May and accepted its surrender on 20 June. Under the French Consulate he was sent to replace Marie Auguste Pâris as commander in chief of colonial troops on Guadeloupe in December 1800. He died at Pointe-à-Pitre on the island and the process of appointing his successor led to the 1801 revolt by Magloire Pélage, Louis Delgrès and their companions, which ended in the resumption of slavery on the island.
