= Cely =

Cély is a commune in the Seine-et-Marne department in north-central France.

Cely may also refer to:

- Cecelia Pedescleaux (born 1945), African-American quilter
- Damien Cely (born 1989), French diver
- Jacques Laurent-Cély (1919–2000), French writer
- Laurent Éon de Cély (1735–1815), French bishop
- Nathalie Cely (born 1965), Ecuadorian government minister and ambassador
- René Maugé de Cely (1757–1802), French zoologist
- Vlasta Cely (1921–2016), Czech-British puppeteer
- William Mauricio Beltrán Cely (born 1973), Colombian sociologist
