= Joseph Rogniat =

French general (1776–1840)

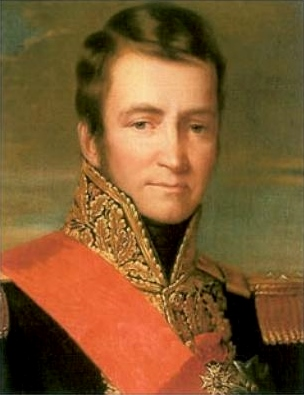
- Born: 9 November 1776; Saint-Priest, Rhône, France
- Died: 8 May 1840 (aged 63); Former 10th arrondissement, Paris
- Burial place: Division 50, Père Lachaise Cemetery, Paris
- Military career
- Allegiance: France (First Republic, First Empire, Kingdom, July Monarchy)
- Branch: Engineers
- Service years: 1794–1828
- Rank: Général de division
- Awards: Viscount; Baron of the First French Empire; Grand-Cross of the Légion d'honneur Commander of the Order of Saint-Louis

Joseph, vicomte de Rogniat (French: [ʒozɛf də ʁɔɲa]; 9 November 1776 – 8 May 1840) was a French general during the French Revolutionary Wars and Napoleonic Wars. His name appears on column 36 of the Arc de Triomphe.

== Family ==
Rogniat was a son of Jean-Baptiste Rogniat, a member of the bourgeoise and a royal notary in Saint-Priest, and his wife Antoinette Fayet. His godparents were Joseph Lafarge, notary and king's counsellor in Lyon, and Lafarge's wife Pierrette Thérèse Metra, whilst his brother Jean-Baptiste became a prefect.

== Life ==
=== Early career ===
Born in Saint-Priest, Rogniat initially studied at the Oratorian College in central Lyon and entered the École d'application de l'artillerie et du génie in Metz as a sub-lieutenant on 28 September 1794. He gained his diploma and was promoted to lieutenant on 5 March 1795. He was immediately posted to the Army of the Rhine, with which he remained until 1797. During that time he was promoted to captain (20 April 1796).

Rogniat was transferred to the engineer corps of the armée d'Angleterre on 10 January 1798. He rose to chef de bataillon on 9 July 1800 and was put in command of the engineers within the central army group of the armée du Rhin in November 1800. On 28 February 1801 he became chief military engineer in Belle-Île-en-Mer, then of Lyon on 15 October 1801 and assistant director of fortifications on 24 November 1801.

=== Europe ===
On 23 October 1805, Rogniat was put in command of the engineers of the Grande Armée's 7th Corps and in 1806 of the engineers in the cavalry reserve corps. On 8 March 1807 he was made a Commander in the Legion of Honour and the same month was put in command of 10th Corps' engineers. Next he was promoted to major and moved to command the engineers of 11th Corps, both on 26 May 1807. That year he took part in the Siege of Danzig, before being transferred to Spain the following year.

Rogniat was made a colonel on 19 February 1808 and fought at the Siege of Zaragoza. He was then put in command of the engineers in 2nd Army Corps in the armée d'Allemagne and promoted to brigadier general, both on 6 March 1809. He was made a baron of the Empire on 17 May 1810, before returning to Spain (1810–1812) to command the engineers in France's Army of Aragon, whose supreme commander was Louis-Gabriel Suchet.

Rogniat took part in the sieges of Lérida (1810), Tortosa (1810–1811), Tarragona (1811) and Valencia (1812). He rose to général de division on 9 July 1811. He rejoined the Grande Armée in the 1813 Saxony campaign, fortifying Dresden before in January 1814 being put charge of the defence of Metz.

=== 1814–1840 ===
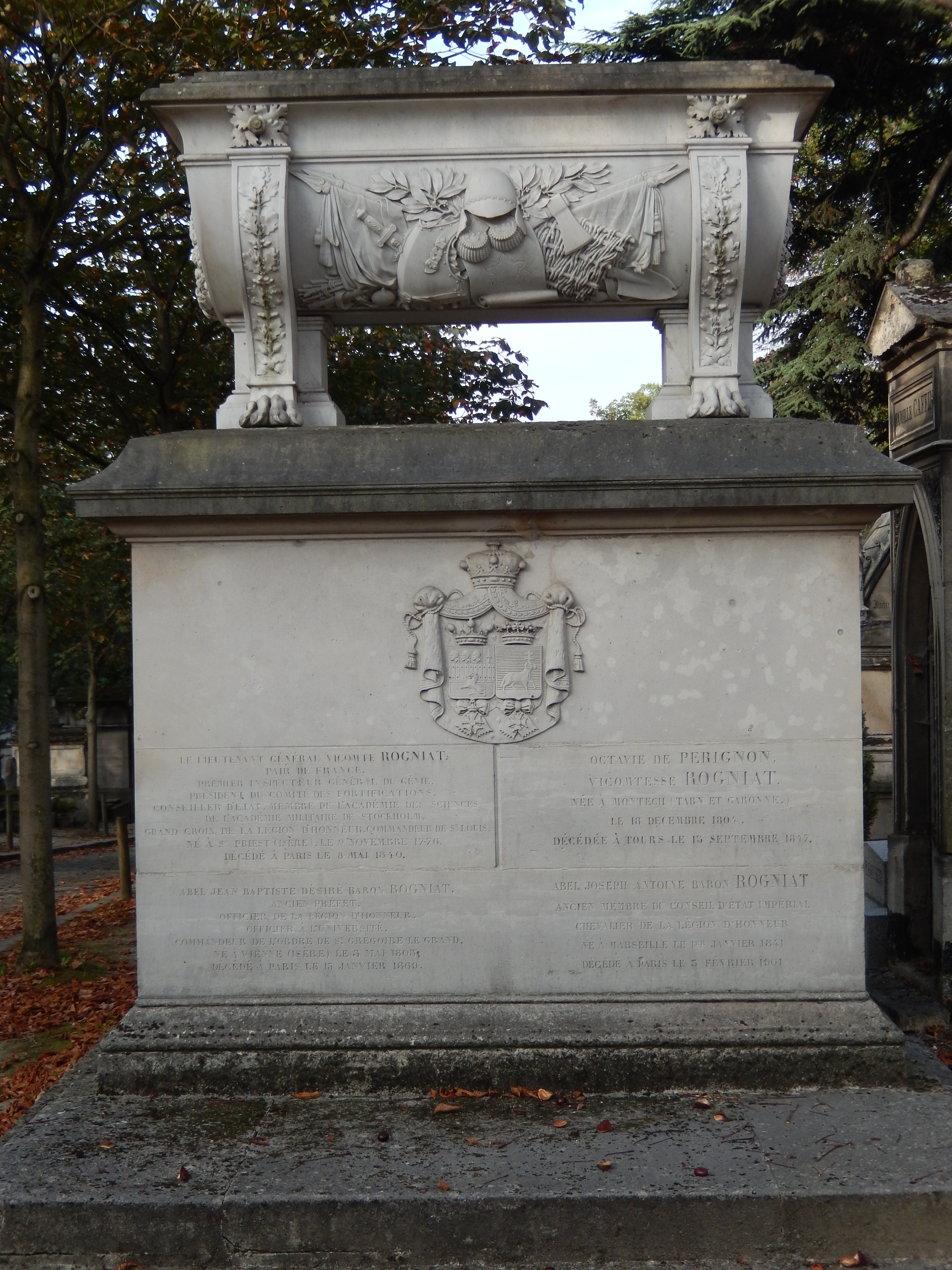
Rogniat's tomb in division 50 of the Cimetière du Père Lachaise.

Rogniat was summoned to Paris on 18 April 1814 after the First Restoration and was ordered to reorganise the engineer corps. Louis XVIII made him a Knight in the Order of Saint Louis on 1 June 1814 and during the Hundred Days the following year he was made a member of the war committee and commander of the engineers in Napoleon's Armée du Nord.

Rogniat remained in the army after Napoleon's second fall, being made a Grand Cross in the Legion of Honour on 20 October 1820, a viscount on 4 September 1822, a Commander in the Order of Saint Louis on 3 November 1827, a Conseiller d'État on 12 November 1828 and an honorary member of the Académie des sciences in 1829.

Rogniat's last army role was as inspector-general of the engineer corps from 12 February 1828 onwards. He was appointed to the Chamber of Peers in 1831, early in the July Monarchy, and died in Paris in 1840.

== Selected works ==
- Relation des sièges de Saragosse et de Tortose par les Français, dans la dernière guerre d'Espagne (1814)
- Considérations sur l'art de la guerre (1816). Republished by Hachette, Paris, 1978. Online version
- Des Gouvernements (1819)
- De la Colonisation en Algérie et des fortifications propres à garantir les colons des invasions des tribus africaines (1840)

== Bibliography ==
- On Rogniat as a military historian - Victor Develay, Présentation du « Traité de l'Art militaire » de Végèce, Librairie militaire, maritime et polytechnique, J. Corréard Éditeur, Paris, 1859.

== Sources ==
- Marie-Nicolas Bouillet and Alexis Chassang (ed.s), 'Joseph Rogniat'in Dictionnaire universel d'histoire et de géographie, 1878
- "Base Léonore entry".
- Révérend, Vicomte (1897). Armorial du premier empire, tome 4. Honoré Champion, libraire, Paris. p. 161..
- Six, Georges. Dictionnaire biographique des généraux & amiraux français de la Révolution et de l'Empire (1792–1814). Paris : Librairie G. Saffroy, 1934, 2 vol. p. 381-382.
