= Jean-Baptiste Rogniat (prefect) =

French politician

Jean-Baptiste Rogniat (French: [ʒɑ̃ batist ʁɔɲa]; 3 May 1771 - ?) was a French politician. His also notable as brother to the general Joseph Rogniat.

== Life ==
Named after his father Jean-Baptiste senior, he was born in Saint-Priest. He became prefect of Puy-de-Dome twice (spring 1815 and 1830–1832) as well as baron de Rogniat.
