= Saint Castor =

Saint Castor may refer to:

- Castor of Apt, bishop of Apt, Vaucluse (Feast:September 2)
- Castor of Karden, first monk of Germany (Treis-Karden) d. 389 (Feast:February 13)
