= Laugier d'Agoult =

Laugier Agoult was bishop of Apt (1103-v.1130). He was a great builder in his diocese and a Crusader of the First Crusade.

== Biography ==
During his episcopacy, he made substantial donations to the abbey of Cluny and the abbey of Saint-Victor de Marseille and was a benefactor in his diocese, which he attributed much of his property, he also endowed the mense of the Cathedral Chapter. His uncle Alfant got him appointed as the bishop of Apt.

== Crusader ==
His uncle answered the call of Pope Urban II and joined Rambaud, Lord of Sault and Simiane and Godfrey of Bouillon. He saw Laugier made a prelate of the crusade. Laugier played a part in the capture of the famous Shroud of St. Anne.

== The Builder ==
Bishop Laugier continued to rebuild and restore the Apt chathédral whose reconstruction had begun under the episcopate of his uncle. He is credited with his brother Rambaud for building the Rotunda of Simiane.

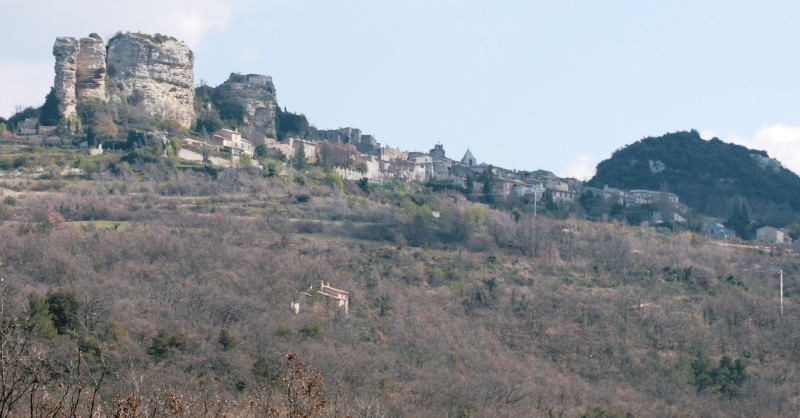
Saignon Castle

In 1113, Laugier, by a solemn act written in the presence of all his clergy and nobles of Apt country, confirmed the membership of the castles of Saignon to his Church. Known as the Rock, or Méjanne Tartamolle and Grugières, these castles installed at the top of the famous Rock, commanded and controlled the julienne6 city.

The rock of Saignon where were built the castles of the Rock, and Tartamolle Grugières. Around 1120, the three castles of Saignon were made subservient by Laugier after tribute to his relatives in the house Agoult-Simiane. In the fall of that same year, the bishop resumed his fief the castle of Clermont, above Apt, nephews Guirand, Bertrand and Rostaing who swore loyalty to him. Two years later, in exchange for their tribute, Laugier gave to his three nephews half of the castle of Gordes, in the diocese of Cavaillon and the Great Tower Apt adding a part of the city against 500 in melgoriens.
