= Marie Auguste Pâris =

Marie Auguste or Augustin Pâris (20 May 1771 - 3 June 1814) was a French general during the French Revolutionary Wars, Peninsular War and Napoleonic Wars.

== Life ==
=== Europe and Caribbean ===
Born in Miramont-d'Astarac, Gers, he was serving as a sergeant in the 7th Gironde Volunteer Battalion (also known as the Bordeaux Battalion) in 1792. He fought as part of the Armée des Pyrénées then the Armée des Pyrénées occidentales from 1792 to 1794, being wounded in 1793 whilst with the latter. He was made a sub-lieutenant then a lieutenant the same year before being ordered to île de Ré. On 23 April 1794 he embarked for Guadeloupe, arriving on 3 June.

He was next promoted to captain, then in July 1794 to lieutenant-colonel, and headed the sans culottes demi-brigade. On 20 July 1794 he was put in command of Port-de-la-Liberté. He was wounded in action again while on Guadeloupe. On 20 October 1796 he was made a général de brigade and on 14 October the following year reoccupied Marie-Galante. He was made military commander of the arrondissement of Basse-Terre. Also in 1797 he married Marie Jacquin (sister of Victor Hugues), with whom he had one child, a daughter. On 19 March 1798 he and his brothers-in-law Hugues and Jean Boudet set up a new agency to administer financial affairs, manage émigrés' estates and arm pirates. This led to suspicions that those estates would be converted to state property, conflict with the United States of America and Hugues' dismissal on 5 June.

Guadeloupe's governor Edme Étienne Borne Desfourneaux was dismissed by the French Directory in August 1799 and on 3 October 1799 that year Pâris was promoted to général de division and Desfourneaux was arrested by forty-six conspirators, who had won over Pâris and general Mathieu Pélardy. Following a vote, Pâris was made Desfourneaux's provisional replacement. On 11 December 1799 he became commander-in-chief of troops on the Windward Islands, a post he held until being replaced by general Antoine de Béthencourt on 30 May 1801.

On 30 March 1800 Pâris and Pelardy received orders to embark on the Dragon and answer for their sending Desfourneaux back to France. He arrived back at Lorient on 17 August 1801 and was confirmed as a brigadier general and demobbed on 7 January 1802. He was authorised to take part in the 1804 campaign as part of the staff of marshal Louis Nicolas Davout before being demobbed again in July that year.

=== Napoleonic Wars ===
He was put back on active service on 8 August 1809 as a brigadier general, joining the Armée du Nord under general Antoine-Guillaume Rampon, then the Armée de la Tête de Flandres under marshal Bon-Adrien Jeannot de Moncey. On 4 October the same year Pâris was transferred to 5th Corps of the Armée d'Espagne under marshal Édouard Mortier. Next he was under the command of general Louis-Gabriel Suchet, heading a brigade in Jean Isidore Harispe's division in the battle for the bridge at Albentosa on 1 March 1810.

He was made an Officer of the Legion of Honour on 28 August 1810 and a baron of the Empire on 21 November the same year. He managed to secure the garrison at Molina de Aragón and fought at Chena in January 1811, then at Puebla de Benaguasil and Saguntum in October, where a musket shot wonuded him in the leg.

On 1 November 1812 he was made governor of the Kingdom of Aragon, replacing general Honoré Charles Reille. On 8 July 1813, as part of the Army of Aragon, he was attacked by Spanish troops at Zaragosa, forcing him to evacuate it on 10 July and retreat towards Lérida then Jaca. He reached Jaca on 13 July and after the Battle of the Pyrénées later that month retreated again, took up positions at Urdos on 12 August and was put in command of defending points where the enemy might try to cross the Franco-Spanish border in the Aspe, Ossau, Barétous and Sainte-Engrâce vallies.

He was then attached to the Armée du Midi and fell back on Oloron in October 1813, fighting at the Battle of the Nive early in December. On 16 December he was put in command of 2nd Brigade in 8th Division, the latter commanded by general Jean Isidore Harispe as part of the Armée des Pyrénées. On 22 December an imperial decree promoted him to général de division.

At the Battle of Orthez on 27 February 1814 he commanded 9th Division and was wounded in battle at Rivareyte. His final command was of the department of Pyrénées-Orientales, until he died of his wound and sickness at Perpignan on 3 June 1814.

== External links (in French) ==
- Marie Auguste Paris on orthez-1814.org
- Marie Auguste Pâris on napoleonicsociety.com.
