= Castor of Apt =

Bishop of Apt, in Gaul

Saint Castor of Apt
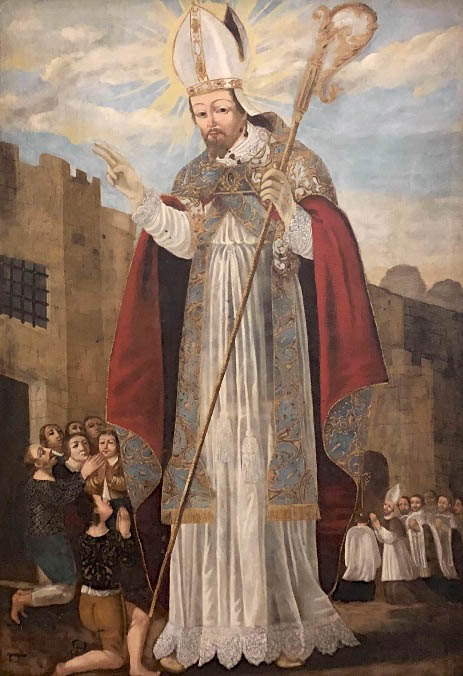
- Born: 4th century Nîmes, France
- Died: c. 420
- Feast: 2 September
- Patronage: Apt, France

Castor of Apt (died c. 423) was a bishop of Apt, in Gaul, perhaps the 4th bishop.

== Life ==
He was born in Nîmes and may have been the brother of Bishop Leontius of Fréjus. He was educated at Arles, and, after the death of his father, he became a lawyer. Castor undertook the case of a wealthy widow with a single daughter, and not only won the case, but visited the imperial court and obtained a rescript ending the lawsuit once and for all. On his return, when the widow's daughter reached marriageable age, Castor married her. A few years later, on the death of his mother-in-law, by mutual agreement Castor and his wife entered enter the religious life; she herself entered a nunnery, while Castor founded the monastery of Saint-Faustin, in Manauque (Monanque) in Provence, which followed the monastic rule of John Cassian. He refused the post of abbot, until, when the first abbot was near death, he ordered Castor to accept the post as his successor out of obedience.

Castor was subsequently made bishop of Apt. When already a bishop, he wrote a letter to John Cassian, abbot of S. Vincent in Marseille, requesting him to write a book on the customs of monks of Egypt and Palestine, De institutis coenobiorum. On 13 June 419, Pope Boniface I wrote a letter to 14 named bishops and the other bishops of the Gauls and Septimania, ordering them to hold a synod before 1 November concerning crimes imputed to Maximus, Bishop of Valence. One of the names is Castorius.

He died of natural causes, on 21 September, of a year unknown in the reign of the Emperor Honorius, who died on 15 August 423.

== Veneration ==
His feast day is September 2. His remains are still preserved in the cathedral of Apt, of which he is one of the patrons.
