= Mathieu Péalardy =

Mathieu Péalardy (9 September 1753 - 5 May 1836) was a French general during the French Revolutionary Wars and Napoleonic Wars.

== Life ==
Born in Vadans, he joined the army on 30 July 1771 as a private in the Grenoble Artillery Regiment (later known as the 3rd Artillery Regiment). He was promoted to sergeant on 1 March 1777 and was transferred to the Artillery Regiment of the Colonies (later the 8th Artillery Regiment) on 16 February 1786. Whilst serving on Antilles (1786-1791) he was promoted to third lieutenant (3 July 1788).

He returned to France in 1791 and rose to second lieutenant on 1 March the following year. His next promotions were to first lieutenant (1 January 1793) and captain (20 September 1793). He was placed in the Revolutionary Armée du Nord in 1792 and 1793, then the armée de l’Ouest in September 1793. He was made temporary director of artillery in Port-Louis and on 21 January 1794 put in command of the artillery on the Windward Islands in the Lesser Antilles. He arrived on 22 April 1794 and fought bravely in the defence of Pointe-à-Pitre, in which the British lost 800 men. The commissioner of the Republic Victor Hugues declared "that he deserved well of the fatherland" and he was directly promoted to temporary général de division on 5 July 1794. He surprised the British by landing at Goyave and using cannon ready to fire against them.

His rank was fully confirmed on 11 September 1794 and he landed back in France on 5 Octobre 1795 aboard the frigate l’Enfant-de-la-Patrie. On 5 June 1798 he was sent back to the Windward Islands, this time as commander of the French garrison, and landed there on 22 November. On 3 October 1799, after convincing Pealardy and general Marie Auguste Pâris, forty-six conspirators arrested Edme Étienne Borne Desfourneaux, governor of Guadeloupe. Pealardy then became provisional governor from 4 to 6 October, after which a vote was taken.

Pealardy and Pâris received orders to sail on the Dragon to France to answer for their actions on sending Desfourneaux back to France. Dismissed from his post, Pealardy was sent back to France aboard the frigate Vengeance, which on 1-2 February was attacked by the American frigate USS Constellation and forced instead to head to Caracas, where Pealardy spent seven months.

On 23 June 1801 Pealardy defended himself against charges of sending Desfourneaux back to France with the intention of taking his place as governor. On returning to Guadeloupe he boarded the corvette le Général Brune on 27 February 1801 and was captured by the British on 9 April. He was released on parole and finally exchanged for a British prisoner after the Treaty of Amiens of March 1802. He retired on 1 July 1811 and died in Versailles almost twenty-five years later.

== Sources ==
- "Generals Who Served in the French Army during the Period 1789 - 1814: Eberle to Exelmans".
- (in French) Thierry Pouliquen. "'Les généraux français et étrangers ayant servis [sic] dans la Grande Armée'".
- (in French) Six, Georges. Dictionnaire biographique des généraux & amiraux français de la Révolution et de l'Empire (1792-1814) Paris: Librairie G. Saffroy, 1934, 2 vol.
- (in French) Courcelles, Baptiste-Pierre (1823). Dictionnaire historique et biographique des généraux français : depuis le onzième siècle jusqu'en 1822, Tome 8. l’Auteur. p. 265..
- (in Polish) "Napoléon.org.pl".

== Bibliography (in French) ==
- Pierre-Eugène Girardot and Armand Boutillier du Retail (Collecteur), Dossiers biographiques Boutillier du Retail. Documentation sur Mathieu Péalardy, Besançon, Le Pays comtois, 1935
