= Veil of St. Anne =

Mantle

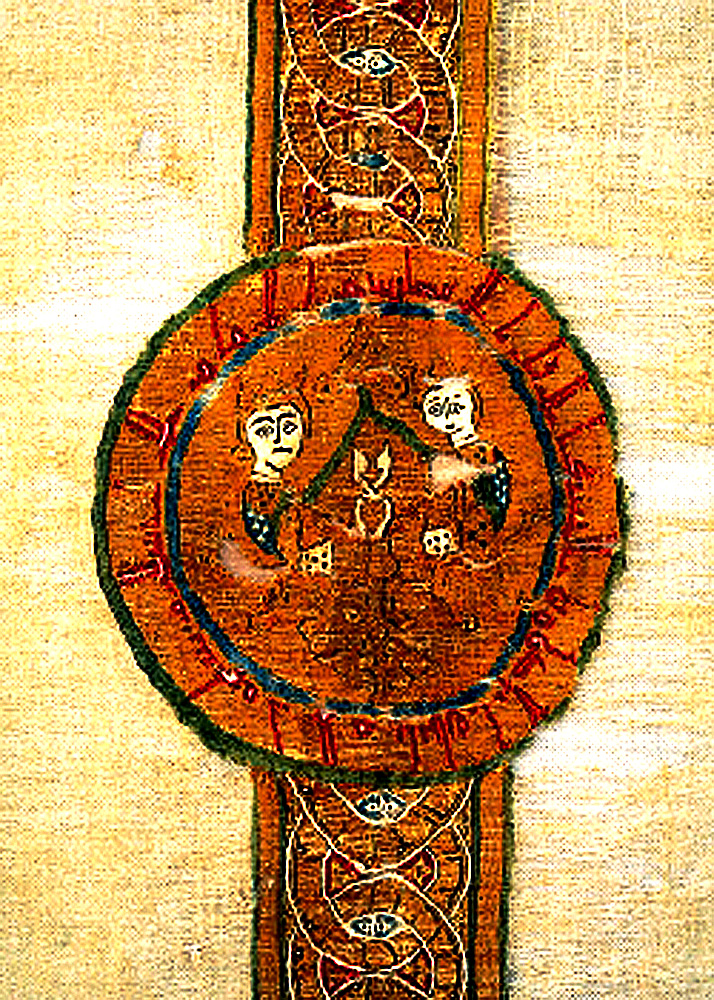
Detail: one of the medallions of the "Veil of St. Anne"

The so-called "Veil of St. Anne" (French: voile de Sainte-Anne), also known as the "Arab Standard" (étendard arabe), is the mantle of a Fatimid caliph, Al-Mustaʽli, from 1096/97, that was brought to Provence after the First Crusade, from Damietta (Note: The archaeologists initially thought that the fabric was taken from the Grand Vizier Al-Afdhal after the Battle of Ascalon in 1099.) and deposited in the treasury of the Cathedral of St. Anne at Apt. For a long time it was considered a Christian relic; today it is recognized as one of the chief surviving examples of Fatimid art.

== Sources ==
- Cornu, Georgette (1999). "Les tissus d'apparat fatimides: parmi les plus somptueux la 'Voile de Sainte Anne'd'Apt". In Marianne Barrucand (ed.). L'Egypte fatimide: son art et son histoire. Actes du colloque organisé à Paris les 28, 29 et 30 mai 1998 (in French). Paris: Presses de l'université de Paris-Sorbonne. pp. 331–337. ISBN 2840501627.
- Delluc, Brigitte; Delluc, Gilles (2001). "Le suaire de Cadouin et son frère le voile de sainte Anne d'Apt (Vaucluse): Deux pièces exceptionelles d'archéologie textile". Bulletin de la Société Historique et Archéologique du Périgord (in French). 128: 607–626.
- Girault-Kurtzemann, Béatrice (1998). "Le "Voile de sainte Anne" d'Apt". Bulletin du CIETA (in French). 75: 37–47.
- Girault-Kurtzemann, Béatrice (2005). "Le "voile de sainte Anne" de l'ancienne cathédrale d'Apt (Vaucluse) : Conservation et restauration". In Benoît-Henry Papounaud; Hélène Palouzié-Gouedar (eds.). Regards sur l'objet roman: Actes du colloque Fortune de l'objet roman organisé par l'Association des conservateurs des antiquités et objets d'art de France, Saint-Flour, 7-9 octobre 2004 (in French). Arles: Actes Sud. pp. 143–148. ISBN 2-7427-5783-X.
- Girault-Kurtzemann, Béatrice (2018). "Le voile de sainte Anne d'Apt, histoire d'une relique". In Marc Heijmans; Anastasia Ozoline (eds.). Autour des reliques de saint Césaire d'Arles: Actes du colloque d'Arles des 11, 12 et 13 octobre 2013 (in French). Arles: Les amis de saint-Trophime. pp. 141–145.
- Léonelli, Marie-Claude (2005). "Le voile de sainte Anne de l'ancienne cathédrale d'Apt (Vaucluse): Une relique derrière les verres". In Benoît-Henry Papounaud; Hélène Palouzié-Gouedar (eds.). Regards sur l'objet roman: actes du colloque Fortune de l'objet roman organisé par l'Association des conservateurs des antiquités et objets d'art de France, Saint-Flour, 7-9 octobre 2004 (in French). Arles: Actes Sud. pp. 137–142. ISBN 2-7427-5783-X.
- Marçais, Georges; Wiet, Gaston (1934). "Le "Voile de sainte Anne" d'Apt". Monuments et mémoires de la Fondation Eugène Piot (in French). 34 (1–2): 177–194. doi:10.3406/piot.1934.1915.
- Poëzévara, Sandra (2019). "Le voile de sainte Anne". In Sandra Poëzévara; Yann Codou (eds.). Saintetés aptésiennes: Trésors, architecture et dévotions dans une cité épiscopale (in French). Apt: City of Apt. pp. 198–204. ISBN 978-295-214-0799.
