= Auspicius of Trier =

Saint Auspicius of Trier

Bishop of Trier, Bishop of Toul
- Died: 130
- Venerated in: Roman Catholic Church Orthodox Church True Orthodox Church
- Canonized: Pre-congregation
- Feast: 8 July

Auspicius (died 130?) is said to be the successor of St. Maternus as the Bishop of Trier, Germany. However, some authorities identify him as the 5th-century Bishop of Toul, France.
