= Ancient Diocese of Apt =

Roman Catholic diocese in France (4 c. - 1801)

Coordinates: 43.88°N 5.40°E

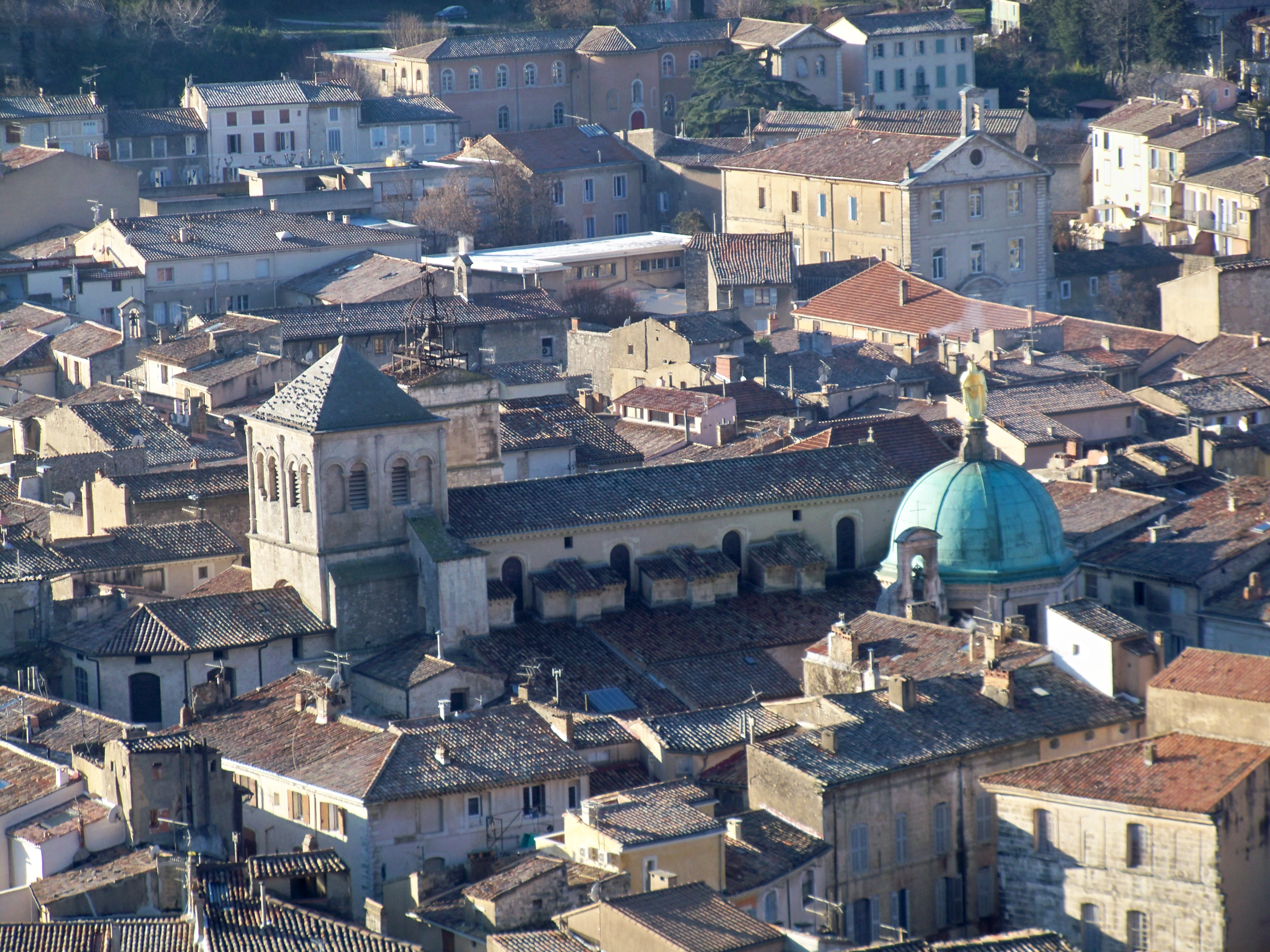
Apt Cathedral in Apt.

The former French Catholic diocese of Apt, in southeast France, existed from the fourth century until the French Revolution. By the Concordat of 1801, it was suppressed, and its territory was divided between the diocese of Digne and the diocese of Avignon. Its seat was at Apt Cathedral, in Vaucluse.

== History ==
The Chapter of the Cathedral of Apt was founded on 4 August 991 by Bishop Teudericus, in consultation with Prince Guillaume of Provence, Archbishop Annone of Arles, Archbishop Amalric of Aix, and Bishop Ingilram of Cavaillon, out of the clerics who served the cathedral. The original charter establishes a corporation composed of a Provost and twelve canons. By March 1247, dignities of the chapter are named in addition to the Provost: the Archdeacon, the Sacristan, the Precentor, and the Operarius.

In 1790 the National Constituent Assembly conceived a plan to destroy the influence of the Estates throughout France and bring the whole country under central administration. This was to be done by the creation of some 83 or 84 'départements'. At the same time the Church was to be brought into subordination by abolishing the old ecclesiastical diocesan system and creating new dioceses which would have the same boundaries as the departments. The plan made more than fifty of the 135 Catholic dioceses in France redundant. The details were enacted by the Legislative Assembly, under the Civil Constitution of the Clergy (1790). The diocese of Apt was one of the dioceses which were declared redundant and were suppressed. The abolition of Catholic dioceses was a violation of Canon Law, and the requirement that the clergy were to be obliged to take an oath to the Constitution in order to hold their jobs and collect their state-supplied salaries brought about a schism. New bishops and priests under the Constitutional system were to be elected by special 'Electors' in each department, who did not need to be Catholics or even Christians. That too was uncanonical and schismatic. The vows of monks and nuns were abolished by the National Assembly, and their property was seized by the State.

In 1801 First Consul Napoleon Bonaparte was preparing to end the religious confusion in France by entering into a Concordat with the Vatican. He had plans for the future, and he required a united France in order to carry them out successfully. In separate actions both he and Pius VII called on all bishops in France to submit their resignations. On November 29, 1801, by the bull Qui Christi Domini, Pope Pius VII suppressed all of the Roman Catholic dioceses in France, and immediately reinstituted them under papal authority. This act did away with whatever doubt or ambiguity might still exist as to a 'Constitutional Church' and 'Constitutional dioceses' in France. Apt was not one of the dioceses that was restored.

The name of the diocese was revived, however, by Pope Benedict XVI in January 2009, as a titular see for bishops who have no diocese of their own.

== Bishops ==
=== to 1100 ===
- 96–102?: Auspice

[260?: Leonius]
[394: Octavius]

- 400–410?: Quentin
- 410–423?: Castor
- 431?–436: Auxonius
- 439–442: Julius
- 517–545: Pretextatus

[546: Eusebius]

- 549–573: Clementinus
- 581–585: Pappus
- 614: Innocentius
- 788: Magneric
- 853: Trutbertus
- 867: Paul (I.)

879: Richard

- 885: Sendard
- 887: Paul (II.)
- c. 951 – c. 955: Rostan
- c. 960 – 964: Arnulf
- c. 965 – c. 984: Nartold
- 989–998: Theodoric
- 999–1110?: Ilbogus
- 1010–1046: Stephanus

[1046?: Laugier I.]

- c. 1048 – c. 1080: Alphant
- 1095?–1099?: Isoard

=== from 1100 to 1500 ===
- [1102?: Bertrand]
- 1103–1143: Laugier II. d'Agout
- 1145–1151: Raimond
- 1158–1162: Guillaume (I.)
- 1162–1182: Pierre de Saint-Paul
- 1186–1193: Guiran de Viens
- 1208–1221: Godefredus I.
- 1221–1243: Godefredus II.
- 1243–1246: Guillaume Centullion
- 1246–1256: Geofroi Dalmas
- 1256–1268: Pierre Baile
- 1268–1272: Ripert de Viens
- 1272–1275: Raimond Centullion
- 1275–1303: Raimond Bot
- 1303–1319: Hugues Bot
- 1319–1330: Raimond Bot (II.)
- 1330–1331: Guiraud de Languissel
- 1331–1332: Bertrand Acciaioli
- 1332–1336: Guillaume d'Astre
- 1336–1341: Guillaume Audibert
- 1341–1342: Guillaume Amici
- 1342–1348: Arnaud
- 1348–1358: Bertrand de Meissenier
- 1358–1361: Elzéar de Pontevès, O.F.M.
- 1362–1383: Raimond Savini
- 1383–1390: Géraud du Breuil (Avignon Obedience)
- 1390–1410: Jean Fillet (Avignon Obedience)
- 1411–1412: Pierre Perricaud, O.P.
- 1412–1430: Constantinus de Pergola
- 1430–1437: Étienne d'Épernay, O.P.
- 1438–1466: Pierre Nasondi
- 1467–1482: Jean d'Ortigue
- 1482–1489: Agricol de Panisse
- 1490–1494: Jean Chabrol

=== from 1500 to 1800 ===
- 1494–1515: Jean de Montaigu
- 1515–1533: Jean de Nicolaï
- 1533–1540: César Trivulce
- 1540–1559: Pierre de Forli
- 1560–1571: Baptiste de Simiane
- 1571–1582: François de Simiane, O.Cist.
- 1588–1607: Pompée de Periglio
- 1607–1628: Jean Pélissier, O.S.B.
- 1629–1670: Modeste de Villeneuve, O.F.M.Observ.
- 1671–1695: Jean de Gaillard
- 1696–1723: Ignace de Foresta
- 1723–1751: Jean-Baptiste de Vaccon
- 1752–1778: Félicien de la Merlière
- 1778–1801: Laurent Éon de Cély

=== Titular Bishops of Apt ===
- 2009-current: Jean-Luc Hudsyn (Auxiliary Bishop of Mechelen-Brussel)

== See also ==
- Catholic Church in France
- List of Catholic dioceses in France

== Bibliography ==
=== Reference works ===
- Albanés, Joseph Hyacinthe; Ulysse Chevalier (1899). Gallia christiana novissima: Aix, Apt, Fréjus, Gap, Riez et Sisteron (in Latin). Montbéliard: Société anonyme d'imprimerie montbéliardaise.
- Gams, Pius Bonifatius (1873). Series episcoporum Ecclesiae catholicae: quotquot innotuerunt a beato Petro apostolo. Ratisbon: Typis et Sumptibus Georgii Josephi Manz. (Use with caution; obsolete)
- Eubel, Conradus, ed. (1913). Hierarchia catholica, Tomus 1 (second ed.). Münster: Libreria Regensbergiana. (in Latin)
- Eubel, Conradus, ed. (1914). Hierarchia catholica, Tomus 2 (second ed.). Münster: Libreria Regensbergiana. (in Latin)
- Gulik, Guilelmus (1923). Eubel, Conradus (ed.). Hierarchia catholica, Tomus 3 (second ed.). Münster: Libreria Regensbergiana.
- Gauchat, Patritius (Patrice) (1935). Hierarchia catholica IV (1592-1667). Münster: Libraria Regensbergiana.
- Ritzler, Remigius; Sefrin, Pirminus (1952). Hierarchia catholica medii et recentis aevi V (1667-1730). Patavii: Messagero di S. Antonio.
- Ritzler, Remigius; Sefrin, Pirminus (1958). Hierarchia catholica medii et recentis aevi VI (1730-1799). Patavii: Messagero di S. Antonio.

=== Studies ===
- Boze, Elzéar (1820). Histoire de l'église d'Apt (in French). Apt: Témollière.
- Duchesne, Louis (1910). Fastes épiscopaux de l'ancienne Gaule: II. L'Aquitaine et les Lyonnaises. Paris: Fontemoing.
- Du Tems, Hugues (1774). Le clergé de France, ou tableau historique et chronologique des archevêques, évêques, abbés, abbesses et chefs des chapitres principaux du royaume, depuis la fondation des églises jusqu'à nos jours (in French). Vol. Tome premier. Paris: Delalain.
- Jean, Armand (1891). Les évêques et les archevêques de France depuis 1682 jusqu'à 1801 (in French). Paris: A. Picard. p. 78.
- Jouve, Esprit Gustave (1859). Notice sur l'ancienne cathédrale d'Apt (Vaucluse) ... (in French). Paris: Pringuet.
