= Ibargoiti =

Municipality in Navarre, Spain

Coordinates: 42°40′50″N 1°28′02″W

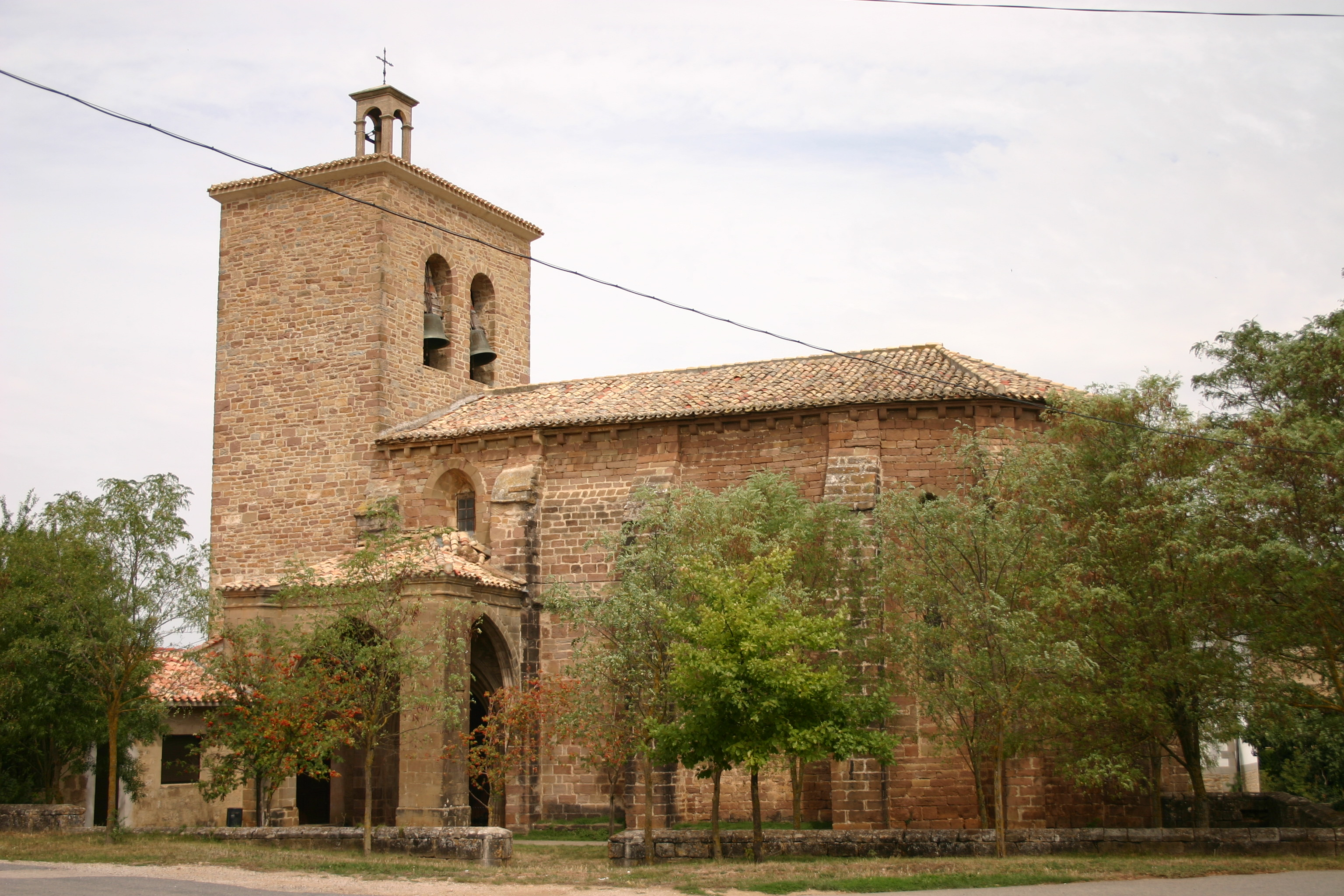
Church of San Miguel in Salinas de Ibargoiti

Ibargoiti is a town and municipality located in the province and autonomous community of Navarre, northern Spain.
