= Ujué – Uxue =

Town and municipality in Navarre, Spain

Coordinates: 42°30′N 1°30′W

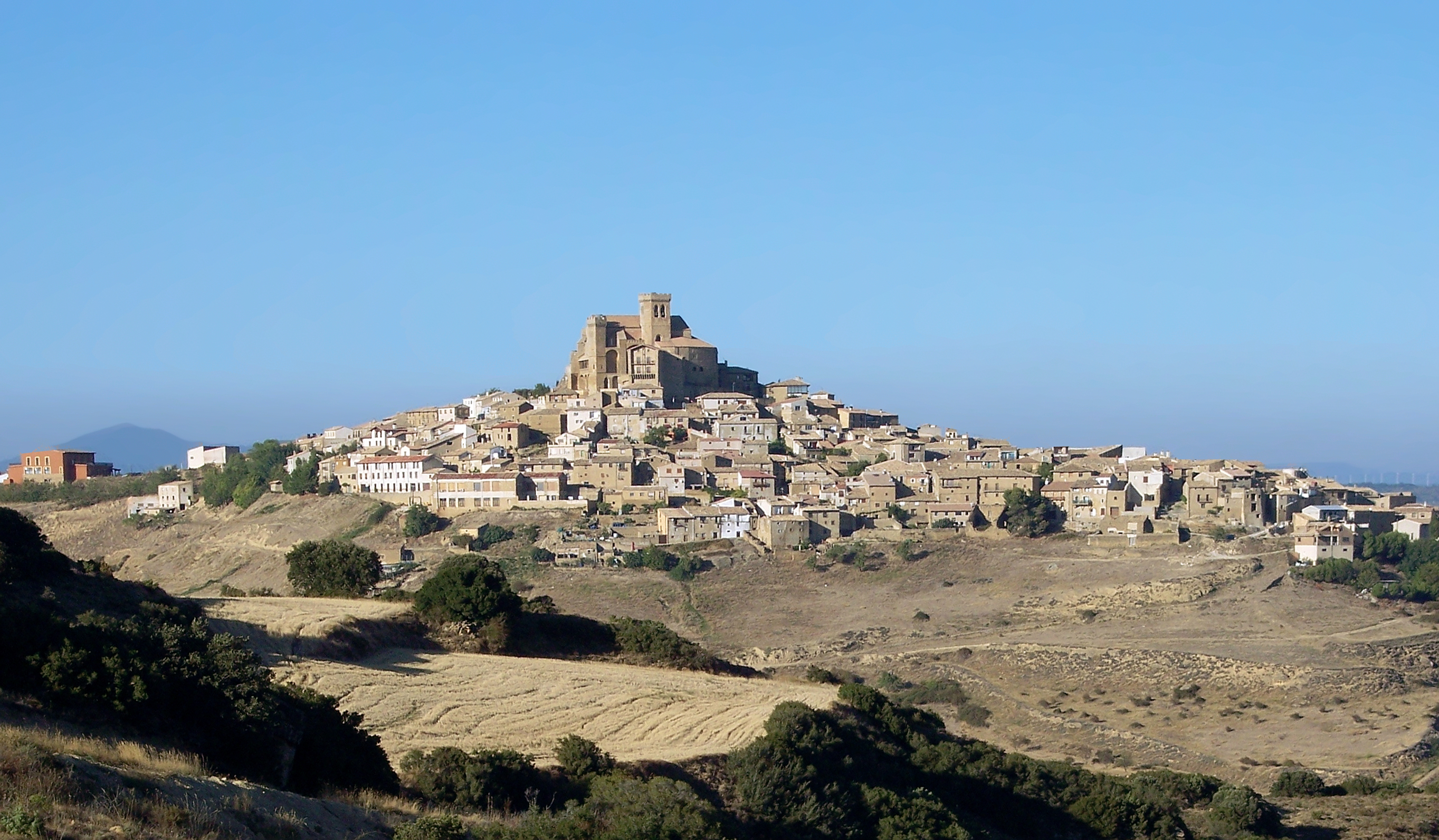
Panoramic view of Ujué

Ujué (Uxue in Basque) is a town and municipality located in the province and autonomous community of Navarre, northern Spain.

According to legend, the town was founded when a shepherd saw a dove entering a hole in the rocks; peering inside he found an image of the Virgin Mary. The name of the town comes from Uxua (dialectal Uxue), the Basque language word for "dove".

The 12th century fortified church of Santa María de Ujué stands on the highest point of the town; it is a fine example of Romanesque architecture, with Gothic additions. The church is listed as a National Monument. Interred in the church is the heart of Charles II of Navarre.
