= Army of Aragon (France) =

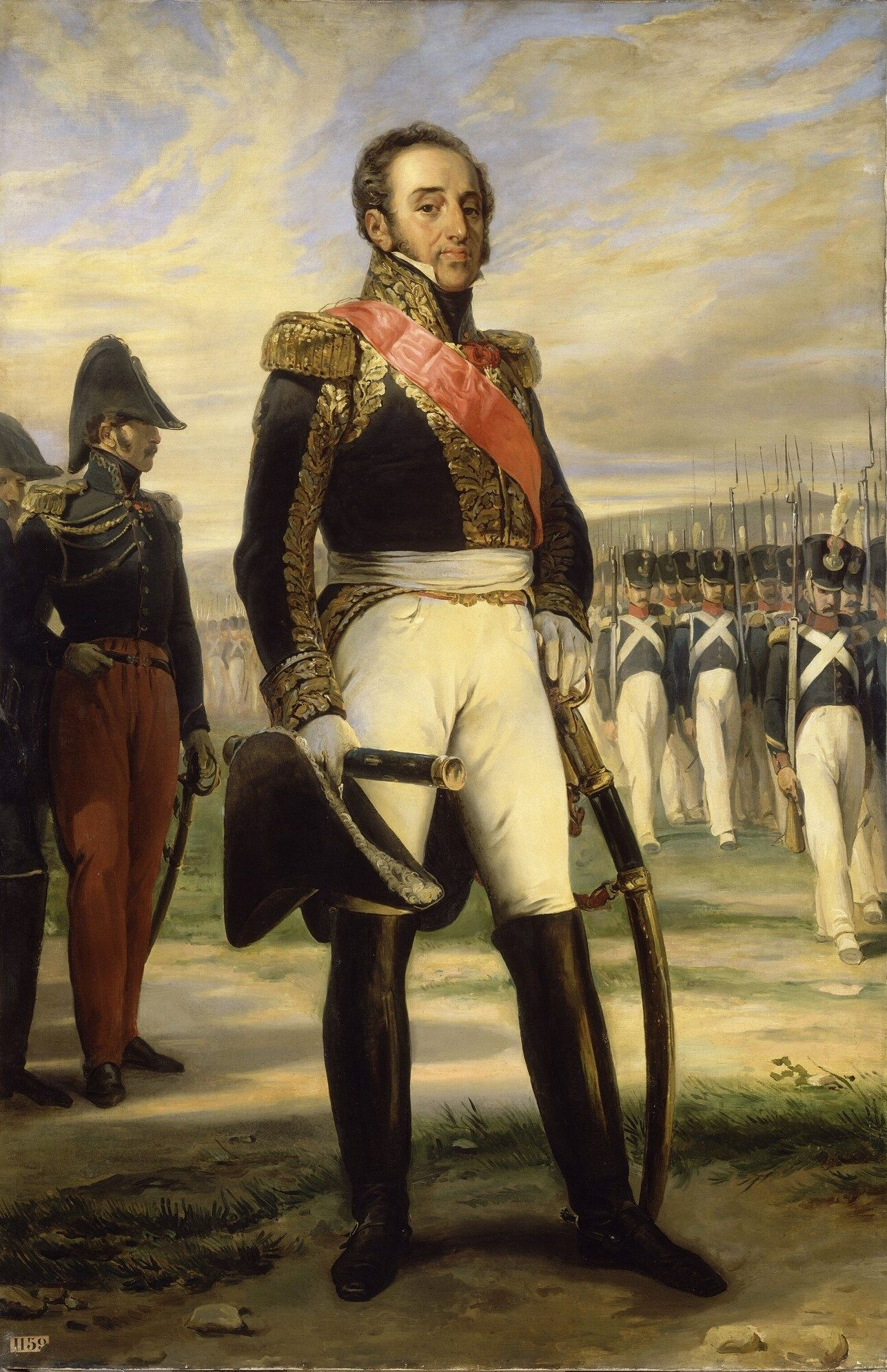
Marshal Louis-Gabriel Suchet, by Guérin.

The Army of Aragon (French - armée d'Aragon) was one of the French field armies which fought in the Peninsular War. It was formed in 1805 as 3rd Army Corps and renamed in 1809. It mainly operated in the Kingdom of Aragon but also sometimes in Catalonia and the Kingdom of Valencia.

Its only ever commander was general Louis-Gabriel Suchet, who was made a Marshal of the Empire in July 1811. It was disbanded in 1814.

== Composition ==
After the Siege of Zaragoza in 1809 the former 3rd Corps had only 9,000 men, who Suchet organised into two divisions, commanded by generals Anne Gilbert de La Val and Louis François Félix Musnier de La Converserie respectively. When reinforcements arrived a third division was formed under general Pierre Joseph Habert. The Army's general staff was headed by general Jean Isidore Harispe, with colonel Saint-Cyr Nugues as his deputy.

By the end of 1809 the Army had 18,000 men, rising to between 22,000 and 25,000 in 1810. In 1810 Suchet was simultaneously placed in command of 7th Army Corps, which solely consisted of the Army of Catalonia under Marshal Étienne Macdonald, but the two Armies were only formally renamed the Army of Aragon and Catalonia in 1813.

At the start of the Siege of Tarragona in 1811 the two Armies had a total of 40,000 men. As of September 1811 the Army of Aragon had 7,000 men spread across the garrisons of Aragon and Catalonia and one field corps of 23,000 men split into five infantry divisions (one Italian, one Neapolitan and the rest French), one cavalry division, 1,800 gunners and 600 pioneers. In December 1811 Suchet received reinforcements from Louis-Pierre Montbrun and the Armée du Portugal, from Jean Barthélemy Darmagnac and the Armée du Centre and from Honoré Charles Reille in Navarre, bringing the Army of Aragon up to 33,000 men.

== Campaigns and engagements ==
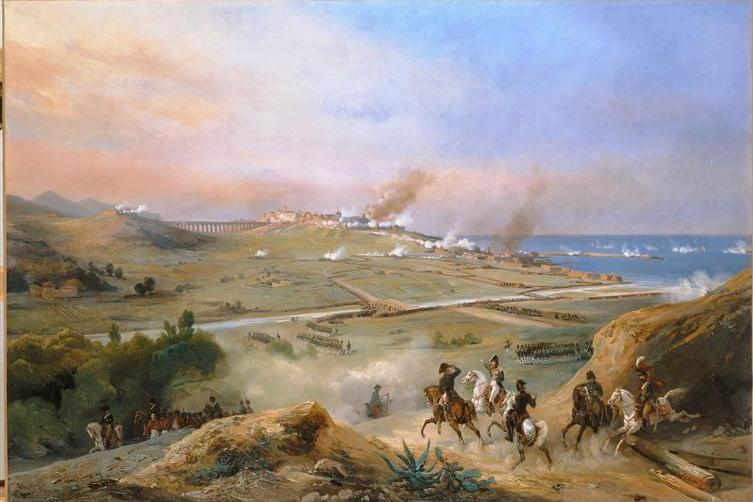
The Army of Aragon's capture of Tarragona in 1811, by Jean-Charles-Joseph Rémond.

At its creation the Army had to mount an offensive against general Joaquín Blake y Joyes's force in Zaragoza, capital of Aragon, beating it twice and scattering it at the battles of Maria and Belchite. At the end of 1809 the French troops moved to pacify the territory under their control. Early in 1810 the Army besieged Valencia during the Andalusian campaign led by Soult. Lacking artillery, it fell back on Teruel five days later.

In April 1810 the Army began the Siege of Lérida, ending in a French victory on 14 May the same year. In July that year it began the siege of Tortosa, beating off two relief forces under Enrique José O'Donnell then Pedro Caro y Sureda and accepting the city's surrender on 2 January 1811. It then returned to pacifying Aragon before on 4 May 1811 besieging Tarragona, which fell on 28 June. Immediately afterwards the Army began pursuing Luis González Torres de Navarra, Marquess of Campoverde's force, almost totally destroying it. Its next objective was again Valencia.

On its march to Valencia it stopped off to besiege Saguntum, again defeating Blake there. It then besieged Valencia again, which was strongly defended until the end of 1811. He finally moved to the offensive on 26 December after receiving reinforcements and encircled the Spanish force, trapping it in the town. After two attempts to escape, Valencia's garrison surrendered on 10 January 1812. For the rest of 1812 the Army beat off an offensive by O'Donnell at the Battle of Castalla before welcoming onto its territory the Armée du Centre and king Joseph Bonaparte as he fled Madrid after the Battle of Arapiles.

The Duke of Wellington launched a general offensive in Spain in 1813 and the Army had to defend Tarragona. After the Battle of Vitoria and the other French field armies' departure from Spain, the Army of Aragon itself had to evacuate the Kingdom of Valencia. On 8 July 1813 the Spanish attacked Zaragoza and forced general Marie Auguste Pâris to leave it and retreat to Lérida. After the loss of Aragon the French evacuated southern Catalonia, left Tarragona's defences and dug in behind the Llobregat.

After confronting William Cavendish-Bentinck's Anglo-Spanish force several times, Suchet fell back to Girona and left behind a strong garrison under general Habert to support the Siege of Barcelona. In April 1814 the Army of Aragon and Catalonia crossed the frontier back into France while Napoleon's abdication put an end to military operations.

== Bibliography (in French) ==
- Hulot, Frédéric (April 2009). Le Maréchal Suchet. Paris: Pygmalion. ISBN 978-2-7564-0234-5. BnF 41464306.
- Pigeard, Alain (September 2002). Dictionnaire de la Grande Armée. Paris: Tallandier. ISBN 978-2-84734-009-9. BnF 38905044.
- Tulard, Jean, ed. (October 1999). Dictionnaire Napoléon. Vol. A–H. Paris: Fayard. ISBN 978-2-213-60485-5. BnF 37090955.
