= Pierre Nicolas d'Agoult =

Pierre Nicolas d'Agoult (1 December 1733 – 27 February 1801) was a French general de brigade (brigadier general). He was a knight of the Order of Saint Louis.

== Bibliography ==
- "Generals Who Served in the French Army during the Period 1789 - 1814: Abbatucci to Azemar". Napoléon-séries.
- "Les généraux français et étrangers ayant servis dans la Grande Armée".
- "Mathieu de Labassee". Napoleon.org.pl (in Polish). Napoléon.org. Archived from the original on 2010-03-04.
- Six, Georges (1934). "d'Agoult (Pierre-Nicolas d')". Dictionnaire biographique des généraux et amiraux français de la Révolution et de l'Empire: 1792–1814 (in French). Vol. 1. Paris: Librairie Historique et Nobilaire. pp. 5–6.
