= Laurent Éon de Cély =

- Bishop of Apt
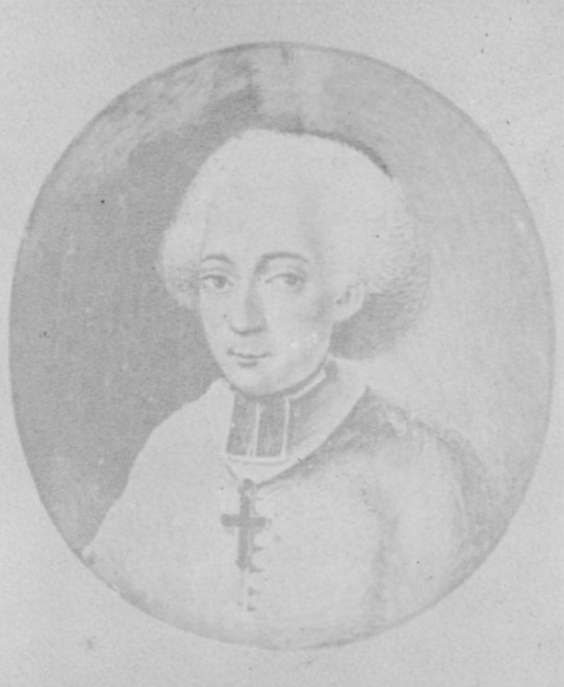
- Laurent-Michel Eon de Cely was the last bishop of Apt from 1778 to 1801.
- Church: Catholic Church
- Archdiocese: Archdiocese of Avignon
- Diocese: Diocese of Apt
- See: Apt
- In office: 1778–1801
- Predecessor: Félicien Bocon de La Merlière

Orders
- Rank: Bishop

Personal details
- Born: Laurent-Michel Eon de Cély
- Died: December, 12,1815 Marseille
- Denomination: Catholicism

== Early life ==
Éon de Cély was born in Bayeux on 25 September 1735 and died in Marseille on 6 December 1815 · .

Laurent-Michel Eon de Cely, son of Baron Michel Eon (died 1780), and his wife Marie-Thérèse Dorothée de Faudoas, born in the parish of Saint-Sauveur, Bayeux. Tonsured 3 March 1747, he was made in 1756 as lord commendatory prior of the Priory of La Valette-lès-Toulon which he resigned in 1786. He became vicar general of the Bishop of Autun Yves Alexandre Marbeuf.

He was made bishop of Apt in 1778, and dedicated in January 1779 in Issy. In his diocese, he removes the seminar and introduced the Parisian Breviary. During the French Revolution, he fled to Italy on 24 August 1789, he arrived in Rome in October where he devoted himself to the study of antiquities. After signing the Concordat of 1801, he resigned his diocese to the Pope on 11 November 1801 and returned to France. He died on 16 December 1815 in Marseille.
