= William Mauricio Beltrán Cely =

Colombian sociologist

William Mauricio Beltrán Cely (born 1973) – Colombian sociologist and Universidad Nacional de Colombia professor whose area of interests are secularization and religious pluralisation in Colombia, and the growth of Protestantism.

== Works ==
- Fragmentación y recomposición del campo religioso en Bogotá: un acercamiento a la descripción del pluralismo religioso en la ciudad, Universidad Nacional de Colombia, 2004, ISBN 9588063167
- De microempresas religiosas a multinacionales de la fe: la diversificación del cristianismo en Bogotá 2006 ISBN 9589744591
- Pentecostales y neopentecostales: lógicas de mercado y consumo cultural, Universidad Nacional de Colombia, 2007 ISBN 9587017544
- El Pentecostalismo en Colombia. Prácticas Religiosas, Liderazgo y Participación Política Colombia 2010. Editorial Universidad Nacional De Colombia ISBN 978-958-8063-72-0
- "Descripción cuantitativa de la pluralización religiosa en Colombia" (PDF). Universitas humanística 73 (2012): 201-238. - bdigital.unal.edu.co.
- Del monopolio católico a la explosión pentecostal: pluralización religiosa, secularización y cambio social en Colombia 2013, ISBN 978-958-761-465-7
