= Auspice (bishop of Apt) =

Auspicius of Apt also known as Auspice of Apt (96–102), was a Pre-Congregational saint, first bishop of Apt, France who was consecrated by Clement I and martyred under Trajan.

== Historic record ==
His name is mentioned in the passion of Saint Nereus and Achilles. and in the "Acts of St. Auspice". His tomb was found during renovation work in 1056, in a crypt under a ruined altar in the Cathedral of Apt.

== Life ==
The hagiographic tradition, holds him first bishop Apt sent by Pope Clement I, and he was martyred under Trajan. Ancient manuscripts hold he was attached to Flavia Domitilla like the brothers Nereus and Achilleus whom he would have himself buried after they were martyred.

== Legend ==
According to a medieval tradition based in Provence, Lazarus of Bethany and his sisters Martha and Mary were put out to sea by those hostile to Christianity "...in a vessel without sails, oars, or helm, and after a miraculous voyage landed in Provence at a place called today the Saintes-Maries." From there Lazarus continued on to Marseilles, where he became the first bishop of the city.

The supposed relics of St. Anne were brought from the Holy Land to Constantinople in 710 and were kept there in the church of St. Sophia as late as 1333. During the twelfth and thirteenth centuries, returning crusaders and pilgrims from the East brought relics of Anne to a number of churches, including most famously those at Apt, in Provence, Ghent, and Chartres. According to Frederick Holweck, "The tradition of the church of Apt pretends that the body of St. Anne was brought to Apt by St. Lazarus, the friend of Christ, was hidden by St. Auspicius (d. 398), and found again during the reign of Charlemagne (feast, Monday after the octave of Easter); these relics were brought to a magnificent chapel in 1664 (feast, 4 May)."

Léon Clugnet says,

Like the other legends concerning the saints of the Palestinian group, this tradition, which was believed for several centuries and which still finds some advocates, has no solid foundation. ...In the opinion of the most competent archæologists, however, this personage is Lazarus, Bishop of Aix, who was consecrated at Marseilles about 407, and who, having had to abandon his see in 411, passed some time in Palestine, whence he returned to end his days in Marseilles. It is more than likely that it is the name of this bishop and his return from Palestine, that gave rise to the legend of the coming of the Biblical Lazarus to Provence, and his apostolate in the city of Marseilles. "
