= Castillet =

Castillet / Castellet
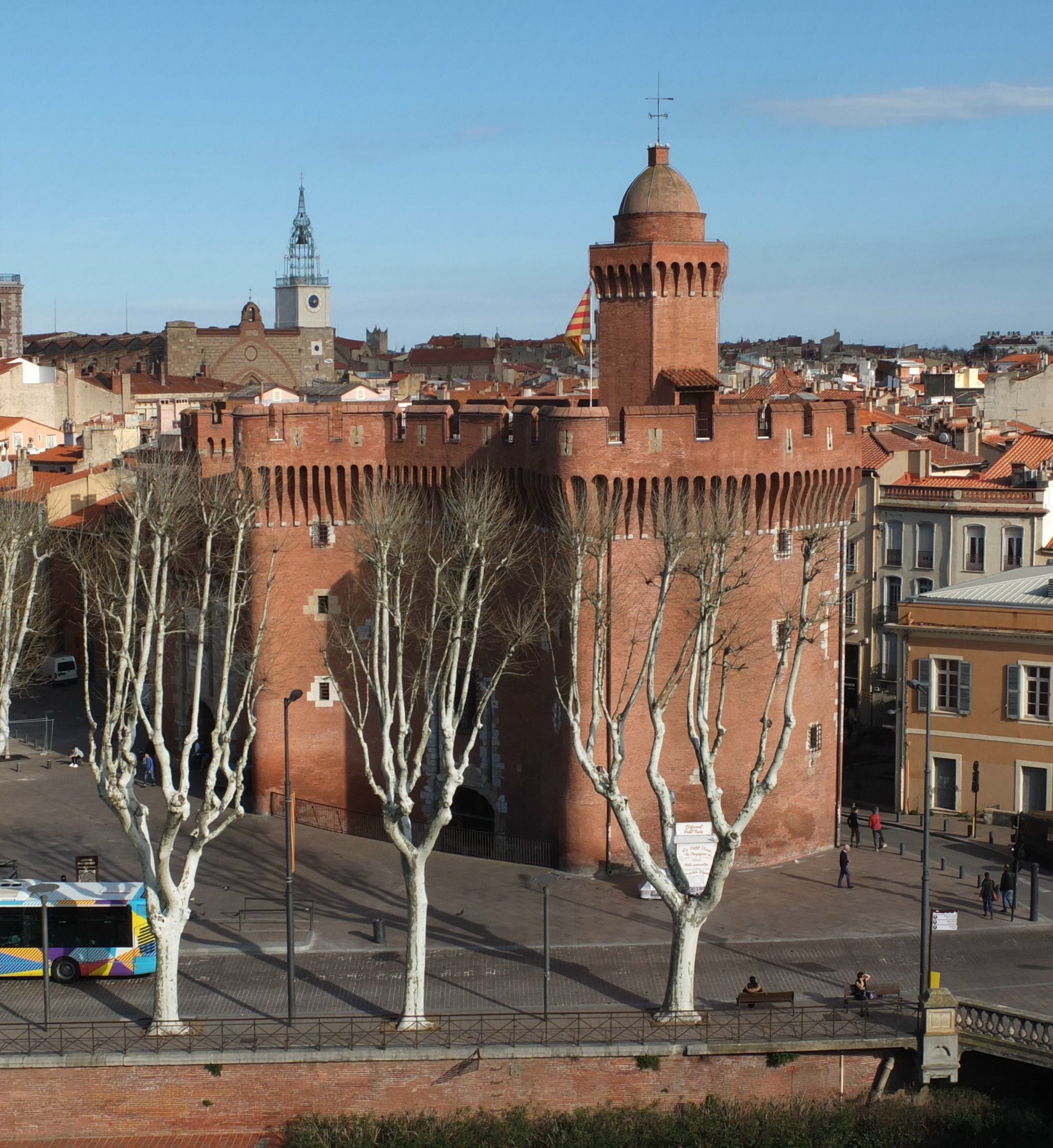
- The Castillet.
- Interactive map of the Castillet / Castellet area

General information
- Type: Fortification
- Location: Perpignan, France
- Coordinates: 42°42′02″N 2°53′38″E
- Construction started: 1368
- Construction stopped: 1542
- Owner: City of Perpignan

Design and construction
- Architect: Guillem Guitard

The Castillet (locally [kəstiˈʎet] or Castellet in Standard Catalan, meaning small castle) is an ancient fortification and city gate located in Perpignan (Pyrénées-Orientales, France). Today, this monument, a strong symbol of the city, has become a museum: Museu Català de les Arts i Tradicions Populars (Catalan Museum of Popular Arts and Traditions).

The Castillet was made of three parts: the big Castillet, the small Castillet (former city gate), and a polygonal bastion. The bastion was destroyed in the early 20th century, but the big and small Castillet were saved from demolition.
