= Jean-Baptiste Rogniat (mayor) =

French politician (1750–1815)

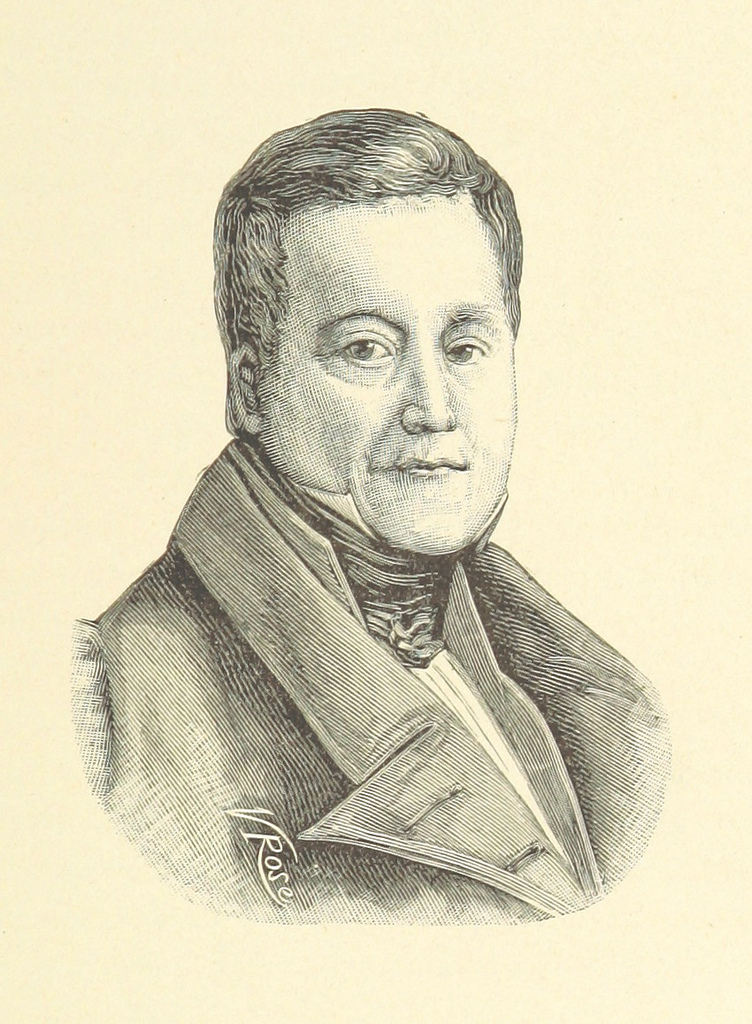
Rogniat in Histoire de l'administration civile dans la province d'Auvergne et le département du Puy-de-Dôme by Georges Bonnefoy, page 459, volume 1.

Jean-Baptiste Rogniat (French: [ʒɑ̃ batist ʁɔɲa]; 7 October 1750 - 15 August 1815) was a French politician. He is also notable as the father of prefect Jean-Baptiste Rogniat (1771- 1845) and general Joseph Rogniat (1776-1840).

== Life ==
Born in Saint-Priest (then a village outside Lyon), he was a royal notary in Chanas at the time of the French Revolution. He became administrator of the Isère department and on 29 August 1791 was elected deputy for that department in the Legislative Assembly, where he became a member of the agriculture committee. Under the French Consulate he became mayor of Chanas and under the First French Empire general councillor for Isère. He died in Chanas.
