= National Volunteers (France) =

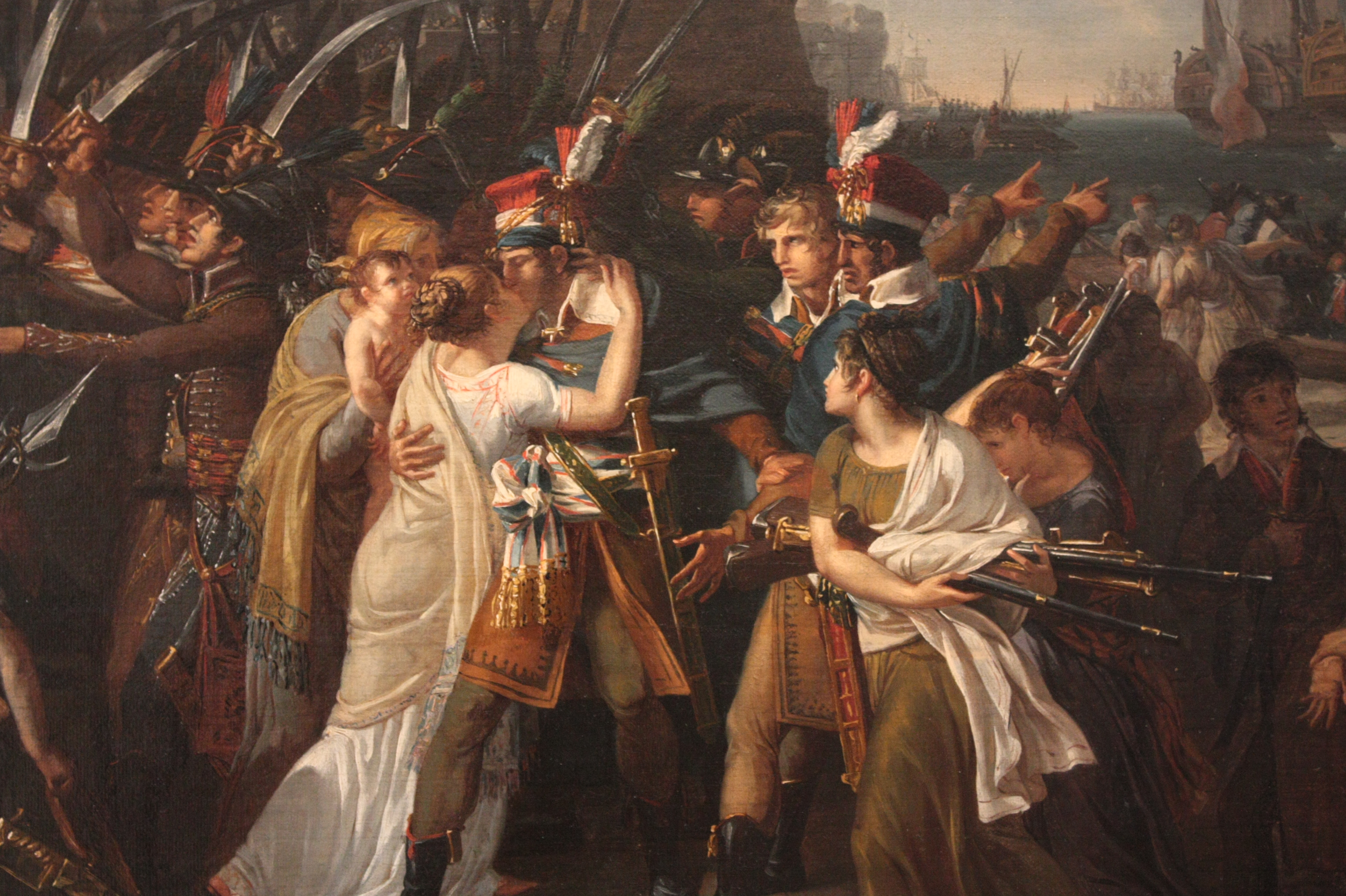
- Guillaume Guillon Lethière (1799) Enlisting the volunteers
- Active: 1791–1796
- Country: Kingdom of France (until 1792) (French First Republic) French Republic (from 1792)
- Branch: (Kingdom of France) French Royal Army (until 1792) (French First Republic) French Revolutionary Army (from 1792)
- Nickname: 'Les Volontaires Nationaux'
- Motto: Honneur et Patrie
- Colors: Red, White, and Blue
- Engagements: French Revolutionary Wars: War of the First Coalition

During the upheaval of 1791, the young Constitutional Kingdom of France began a process of mobilisation, which would become known as a Levée en masse (Mass Levy) in a call for volunteers to defend the borders of France. With monarchist emigration growing and the King and his court preparing to flee, Article 14 of the law of 15 June 1791 passed making the mass levy official. The new law called for at least one unit be raised in each department and in each district for the national defence of the territory.

With the outbreak of the War of the First Coalition on 6 July 1792, the first one-hundred units were raised immediately sent into the Paris region where they became known as the 'National Volunteers' or Volontaires Nationaux. However, this name was more-or-less an information designation, as the older term of National Guard or Garde Nationale was preferred and typically used in official documents.

== History ==
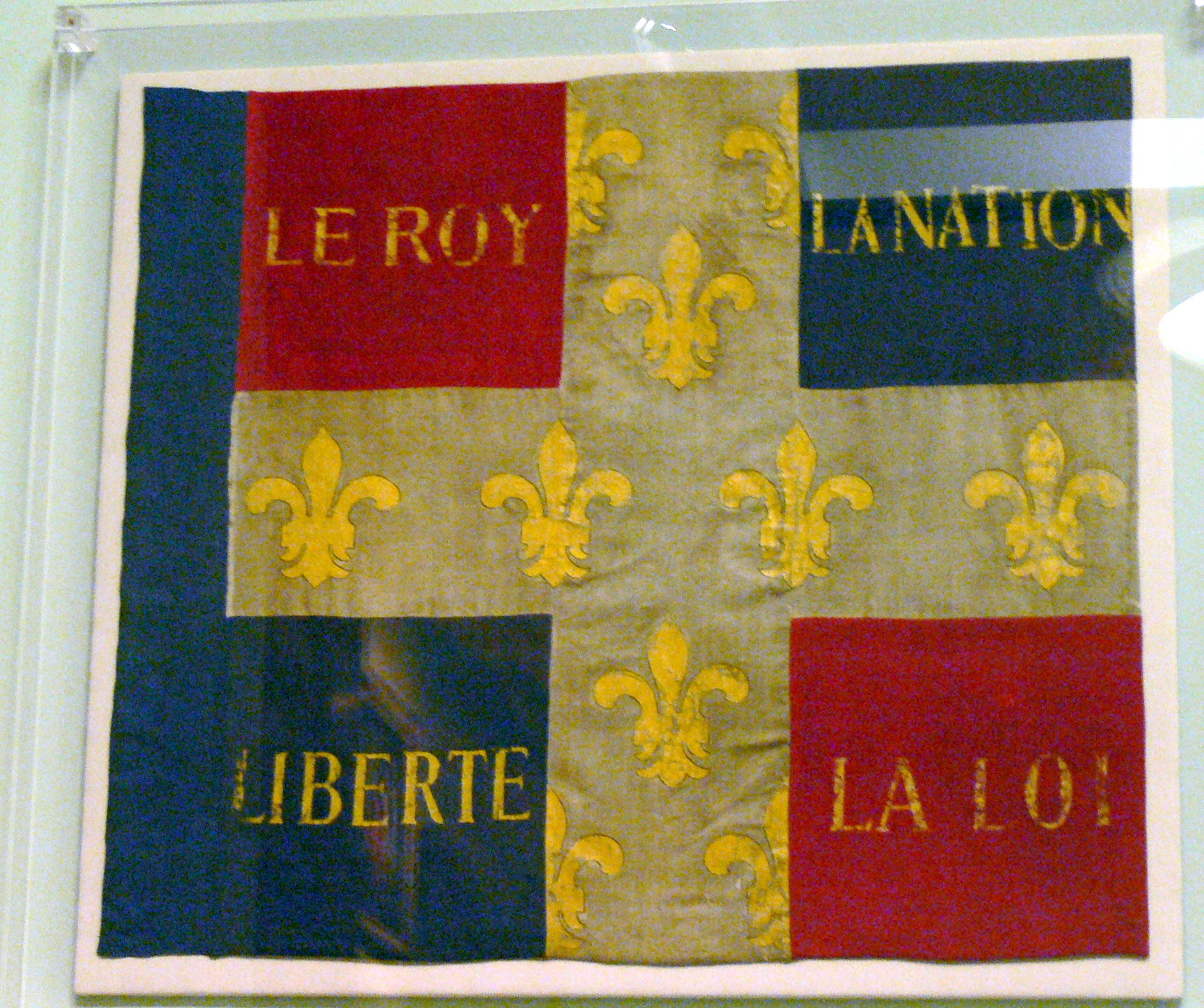
Infantry flag of the revolutionary period (1789–1793)

On 14 July 1789, the date of the Storming of the Bastille and official beginning of the French Revolution, the French Royal Army, including the Maison du Roi (King's Household) included the following:

- Cavalry Corps
  - 26 x line cavalry regiments
  - 18 x dragoon regiments
  - 12 x chasseurs à cheval (light horse) regiments
  - 6 x hussar regiments
- Infantry Corps (non-foreign) – 79 line infantry regiments in two battalions, except for the King's Infantry Regiment with four
  - 23 x Foreign Line Infantry Regiments – with two battalions each
  - 12 x battalions of chasseurs
- 7 x artillery regiments – each with two battalions
- 15 x companies of sappers and miners

This official structure left the army with 218 infantry battalions, 14 artillery battalions, and 206 mounted cavalry squadrons. Its normal strength was therefore 172,974 men during peacetime or 210,948 men during wartime. These troops were not conscripted, and all troops were volunteers.

The reserve troops however, were selected by ballot and comprised two separate forces, the Militia Force (Troupes de Milice) and the Provincial Troops (Troupes Provinciales). The Militia was organised into 13 separate 'Royal Grenadier Militia' regiments organised by province or region. 16 provincial regiments, mostly based on the borders, and 78 garrison battalions, which were nominally independent but under administrative command of the infantry regiments. The reserve troops wherefore comprised 55,240 men during peacetime or 76,000 during wartime. These troops were very well trained, and by no means can be compared to the part-time Militia of Great Britain, which was organised very differently. As part of the reductions to the Army in 1791, the reserve troops were disbanded with effect from 4 March 1791.

That same year, the creation of the National Volunteers saw a use for the recently distributed reserve troops. These reserve troops helped provide a massive pool and experienced cadre for the many new national volunteer troops answering the mass levy. The new volunteers called for each battalion to have 568 men from the national guard of the border departments, totalling around 26,000 men. The departments of Nord, Pas-de-Calais, Jura, Haut-Rhin, Bas-Rhin, Moselle, Meuse, Ardennes, and Aisne each provided as many men as they could possibly muster. The remainder of the departments provided between 2,000 and 3,000 troops each known as 'volunteers'.

The decree of 21 July 1791 called for the creation of battalions within the interior for 74,000 troops, a massive expansion on the original 26,000 previously requested. The troops provided the first 170 battalions of national volunteers, the number of which would be increased successively from 200 to 380, then to 502, and finally a max of 755 battalions.

The cavalry were less successful with creating volunteer units as the regular army had already been short of horses at the beginning of the war. There were however, some cavalry units formed nonetheless including six chasseurs à cheval companies (of 130 men) attached to the previous 6 volunteer units. Later, many new cavalry units were also formed including the Liberty Hussars, Equality Hussars, Poachers Hussars, Germanic Legion, and many others.

== Composition ==
Each national volunteer battalion varied in strength, but were all organised the same: 8 to 10 companies of 50 men and 3 officers each. Each battalion comprised 8 or 9 infantry companies, and one of grenadiers. The strength of the battalions varied from 500 to 800 men. The battalion was commanded by a colonel and two lieutenant colonels with each officer being elected by their unit.

== List of battalions by department ==
=== Ain ===
From 1791 to 1796, the 9 districts of Ain (Pont-de-Vaux, Bourg-en-Bresse, Nantua, Gex, Belley, Saint-Rambert-en-Bugey, Montluel, Trévoux, and Châtillon les Dombes) provided 13 battalions of national volunteers.

Name	Formation Date	Disbandment Date	Successor Unit	Formations	Notable Engagements	Notable Personalities
1st Ain Volunteer Battalion	21 January 1792	12 August 1793	91st Line Demi-Brigade	Army of the Alps; Army of the Rhine	Battle of Wissembourg	Pierre Argoud
2nd Ain Volunteer Battalion	1 December 1791	26 February 1796	10th Line Demi-Brigade	Army of the Rhine; Army of the Vosges; Army of the Mainz; Army of the West; Army of the Coasts of Brest; Army of the Coasts of Cherbourg	Vendée Revolt; Battle of Cholet; Battle of Savenay; Battle of Joseelin; Battle of Quiberon	Étienne Vincent Sédillot de Fontaine; Benoît Prosper Sibuet; Jean-Baptiste Rouville
3rd Ain Volunteer Battalion	12 December 1791	5 July 1795	199th Line Demi-Brigade	Army of the Rhine; Army of the Vosges; Army of the Moselle	Battle of Kaiserslautern; Siege of Luxembourg	Jean-Baptiste Rouville; Barthélemy Catherine Joubert; Claude Marie Joseph Pannetier
4th Ain Volunteer Battalion	9 August 1792	12 August 1793	201st Line Demi-Brigade	Army of the Alps		Aimé Olivier Duport
5th Ain Volunteer Battalion	15 August 1792	12 August 1793	4th Light Demi-Brigade	Army of the Alps; Army of the Rhine; Army of the Rhine and Moselle		
6th Ain Volunteer Battalion	22 August 1792	12 August 1793	200th bis Line Demi-Brigade	Army of the Alps		
7th Ain Volunteer Battalion	21 September 1792	12 August 1793	Yonne Volunteer Demi-Brigade	Army of the North		
8th Ain Volunteer Battalion	4 September 1792	12 August 1793	Split: 201st Line Demi-Brigade; 203rd Line Demi-Brigade	Army of the Rhine; Army of the Alps; Army of the Rhine and Moselle	Siege of Luxembourg; Siege of Mainz	Jean-Baptiste Rouville
8th bis Ain Volunteer Battalion	26 August 1793	1793	209th Line Demi-Brigade	Army of the Alps; Army of Italy; Army of the Rhine		
9th Ain Volunteer Battalion	18 November 1793	1793	17th Light Demi-Brigade	Army of the Alps; Army of the Rhine		
10th Ain Volunteer Battalion		26 February 1796	39th Line Demi-Brigade	Army of Italy		
11th Ain Volunteer Battalion	22 September 1793	26 February 1796	22nd Light Demi-Brigade	Army of the Alps; Army of Italy		
Montferme Volunteer Battalion	22 September 1793	26 February 1796	165th Line Demi-Brigade		Siege of Lyon	
