= Louis-Annibal de Saint-Michel d'Agoult =

Louis-Annibal de Saint-Michel d'Agoult (22 February 1747 – 17 December 1810) was a French general de division (brigadier general). He was an officer of the Legion of Honour, a knight of the Order of Saint Louis and a commander of the Order of Saints Maurice and Lazarus. He died in Spain.

== Bibliography ==
- Tony Broughton. "Generals Who Served in the French Army during the Period 1789 - 1814: Eberle to Exelmans". Napoléon-séries.
- "Les généraux français et étrangers ayant servis dans la Grande Armée".
- "Notice no. LH/646/36". Base Léonore (in French).
- "Louis Annibal de Saint-Michel d'Agoult". rolo.eu.
- Courcelles, Baptiste-Pierre (1822). "28". In l’Auteur (ed.). Dictionnaire historique et biographique des généraux français : depuis le XI^{e} siècle jusqu'en 1822, vol.1. p. 490..
