= Apt Cathedral =

The Cathedral of Saint Anne of Apt Cathédrale Sainte-Anne d'Apt
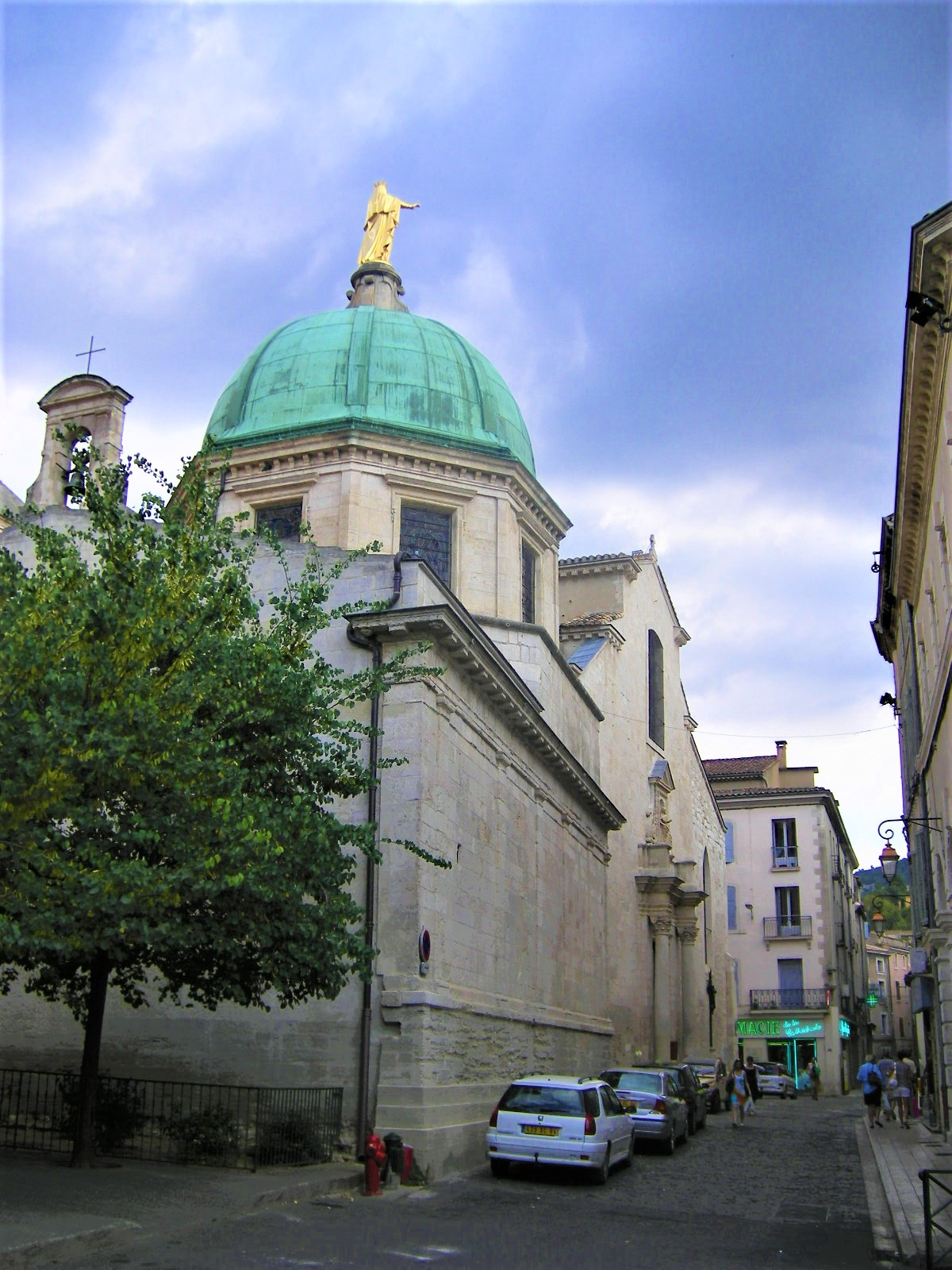
- Saint Anne's Church
- The Cathedral of Saint Anne of Apt; Cathédrale Sainte-Anne d'Apt
- Location: Apt, Vaucluse
- Country: France
- Denomination: Roman Catholic Church

History
- Status: Parish church
- Founded: 1795
- Dedication: Blessed Virgin Mary

Architecture
- Architectural type: church
- Style: Romanesque, Baroque
- Completed: 1810

Administration
- Diocese: Dioceses of Avignon

Clergy
- Bishop: Jean-Pierre Cattenoz

Apt Cathedral (Cathédrale Sainte-Anne d'Apt) is a Roman Catholic church and former cathedral located in the town of Apt in Provence, France now designated as a national monument.

The shrine is the relic church of Saint Anne. Formerly a cathedral, it was the seat of the Bishop of Apt until the French Revolution. Under the Concordat of 1801, the diocese was divided between the Dioceses of Avignon and Digne.

Pope Pius IX granted a Pontifical decree of coronation towards its venerated Marian image through the former Archbishop of Avignon, Monsigneur Louis Anne Dubreil on 9 September 1877. The white marble image depicting a child Blessed Virgin Mary is notable for having been a late creation of the renowned religious sculptor, Giovanni Maria Benzoni.

== History ==
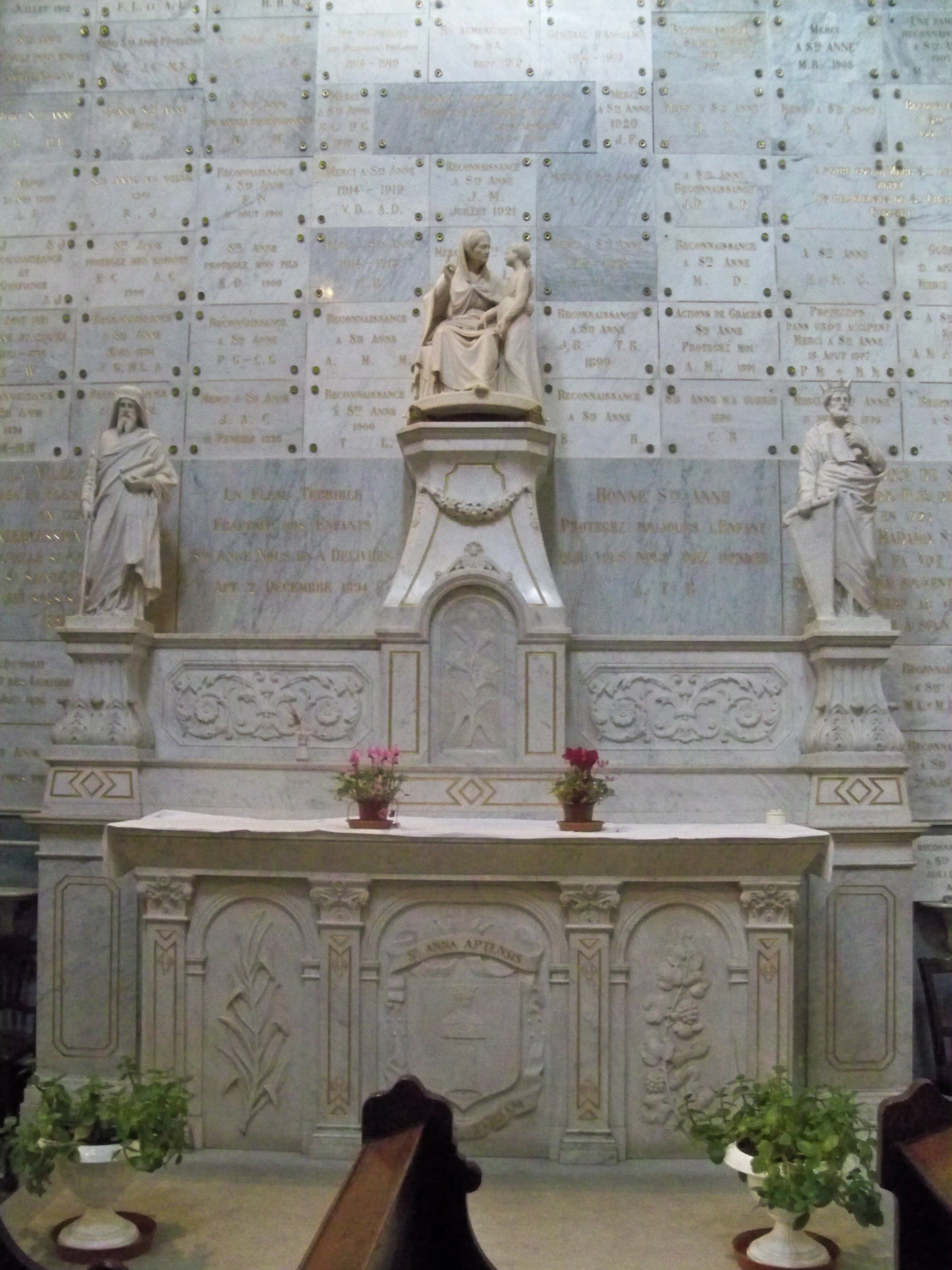
The marble statue of the child Mary and Saint Anne, granted a decree of canonical coronation by Pope Pius IX to the former Archbishop of Avignon, Louie Anne Dubreil on 9 September 1877. White marble, by Giovanni Maria Benzoni.

The cathedral is believed to have been built on the site where Saint Auspice was buried. Tradition holds that Auspice became the custodian of the relics of Saint Anne, which it is said he placed in a subterranean grotto to protect them from desecration by the barbarians. The church became a pilgrimage site. The former Queen of France, Anne of Austria came there in 1623. The church was the ecclesiastical seat of the diocese of Apt, until the diocese was dissolved in 1801.

== Architecture ==
The cathedral combines a variety of architectural styles from Romanesque to Baroque. The lower crypt is part of the original 1st-century Roman building, used as a place of worship as early as the Carolingian era, and consists of a corridor leading to a vault where, according to local legend, Saint Anne's veil was found.

The upper crypt dates back to about 1056 and consists of a small nave (around 8 metres or 26 feet) and an apse.

== See also ==
- Veil of St. Anne
- Vgo (stone mason)
