= François Dutertre =

French military officer

General François Dutertre
- Born: 4 September 1760; Mayenne, France
- Died: 11 April 1843 (aged 82); Villebernier, France
- Military career
- Allegiance: France
- Branch: French Army
- Rank: Brigadier general
- Conflicts: French Revolutionary Wars; Napoleonic Wars

François Dutertre (4 September 1760 – 11 April 1843). was a French Brigadier general who served during the French Revolutionary Wars and the Napoleonic Wars. François Dutertre is most known for being accused of numerous criminal activities. Dutertre is also known for his controversial role in the War in the Vendée and for commanding the escort of the Fructidor deportees to Cayenne in 1797. In his 1800 work, Départ du temple, pour Cayenne, François Dutertre sought to refute the atrocities attributed to him, accusing his political enemies—Royalists and Chouans from his region—of seeking to discredit him due to his republican views.

== Biography ==
=== Origins ===
François Dutertre was born in Mayenne into a modest family: He is the son of René Dutertre, a cooper and Renée Hunault. Initially a poultry merchant, he turned to banditry and illegal trafficking. In 1789, he was convicted of robbing a pharmacist’s shop and reselling the goods in Brittany, for which he was sentenced to two years in prison or even the galleys.

=== Military career ===
Dutertre claimed to have served in the Régiment Royal des Vaisseaux from March 1, 1781, to September 19, 1783, gaining his first military experience in the Antilles. In 1789, he was again convicted of theft and sentenced to prison. Married, he acquired financial ease through his wife’s inheritance, which included a property in Basse-Terre, Guadeloupe, near Fort L'Olive, yielding over 100,000 francs in revenue. He was discharged from the military on September 17, 1783.

Pardoned by the French Revolution, he joined the army and rapidly rose through the ranks, becoming a captain and then a brigadier general. Dutertre claimed to have participated in the Insurrection of 10 August 1792, where he was wounded while defending the king.

He joined the National Volunteers and was promoted to second lieutenant of the grenadiers by his comrades-in-arms on July 18, 1792. He quickly advanced, becoming captain of the First Battalion of Orne on March 1, 1793. On November 15, 1793, he was tasked with transporting 43 Vendéans (including a 10-year-old girl; seven died en route) from Mayenne to Alençon, where they were abandoned in hospitals.

Dutertre claimed to have been promoted to adjutant general on the battlefield (after a bullet shattered his arm above the forearm) and finally to provisional brigadier general in 1794 (9 Brumaire Year III), appointed by Jacques Garnier and confirmed by the Committee of Public Safety. His promotions were justified by his 19 wounds (three of them severe) and his bravery in combat, particularly during campaigns against the Chouans in Vendée. His rank of brigadier general was officially recognized on 22 Fructidor Year V. Due to his injuries, he was forced to cease active duty and was authorized to request retirement on July 27, 1795.

General, I have received and read with the greatest interest the judgment of the 4th of this month, which you sent me; it is always pleasing for a friend of liberty to see one of its defenders honorably acquitted of the accusations leveled against him. Greetings and fraternity. — MERLIN. — Philippe-Antoine Merlin de Douai

In 1796, Dutertre was convicted of theft. He provided information on Chouan leaders in the Fougères region to the Committee of Public Safety on 22 Messidor Year III. On 29 Germinal Year IV, he was sentenced in absentia in Mayenne to one year in irons for complicity in the embezzlement of two Republic-owned wood carts.. On 14 Brumaire Year V, he was acquitted of these charges. On 14 Thermidor Year IV, Philippe-Antoine Merlin de Douai, Minister of Justice, submitted to the Directory a decree referring Dutertre to a military council in Paris:

Everything in this judgment is revolting, everything is monstrous... The form and substance of this trial are equally vicious; one sees the most revolting partiality seizing with pleasure the opportunity to strike ignominy at the Republic in the person of one of its defenders... But despite the iniquity and absurdity of this judgment, it exists, and Dutertre must purge his contumacy; he requests to do so...

Dutertre denounced the actions of MM. Moullin (president of the criminal court) and François Midy (deputy public prosecutor), whom he accused of political persecution. The fifth war council annulled the first judgment and acquitted Dutertre on 4 Brumaire Year IV. Dutertre claimed to have been the guardian of the Temple Tower when William Sidney Smith was imprisoned there. On 19 Fructidor Year V (after the Coup of 18 Fructidor), he was reinstated as brigadier general in the 17th Military Division, commanded by Charles-Pierre Augereau. On 20 Fructidor Year V, he joined the Army of the Rhine and Moselle. His appointment coincided with his delicate mission: escorting political deportees.

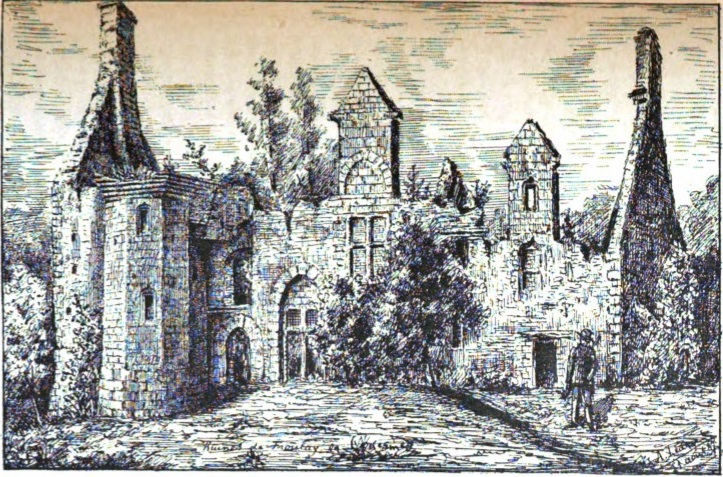
Drawing of the Froulay Manor in Couesmes (1889) by Abbé Ledru.

While stationed in Aumont, Loire, Dutertre acquired the priory of Couptrain as a bien national. He amassed numerous Biens nationaux in Mayenne, seized from émigré families such as the de Montesson and de Froulay.

=== Role in the Fructidor Deportation ===
==== The Deportation ====
In September 1797, after the Coup of 18 Fructidor, the French Directory (despite Dutertre’s prior in absentia conviction for theft and embezzlement) and Charles-Pierre Augereau tasked him with escorting 18 political figures—suspected of Royalist sympathies and condemned to deportation—to Rochefort and then to Sinnamary, French Guiana. Among the deportees were Jean-Charles Pichegru, François Barthélemy, Jean-Pierre Ramel, André-Daniel Laffon de Ladebat, and François Barbé-Marbois. His mission was politically sensitive: ensure the deportees’ security while treating them humanely, despite strict instructions and risks of attacks or escapes.

Barras, warned, rushed to the balcony, followed by his guests, and showed them Pichegru—three days earlier, the rival of Moreau, Hoche, and Bonaparte—Barthélemy, his colleague, Villot, Delarue, Ramel, and all those whom a twist of fortune or an oversight of Providence had just placed at his disposal. Amid the laughter of a noisy joy, the deportees heard Barras recommend to Dutertre, Augereau’s man, to take good care of these gentlemen; to which Dutertre replied: ‘Be at ease, General.’ — The Whites and the Blues, Alexandre Dumas.

==== Conduct of the Escort ====
Dutertre left Paris on 22 Fructidor Year V (September 8, 1797) with an escort of 100 mounted hunters from the 21st Chasseur à Cheval Regiment. The deportees were transported in iron cage carts, originally designed for Conspiracy of the Equals. Despite the harsh conditions, Dutertre claimed to ensure the deportees were fed properly, lodged in decent quarters (when possible), and treated with respect. He allowed visits from wives and relatives and opposed the excesses of his subordinates, particularly Adjutant Generals Jean Christophe Colin de Verdière and Pierre-Joseph Guillet, whom he accused of wanting to harm the deportees. In reality, the overland journey from Paris to Rochefort in iron cages, followed by the sea voyage to Cayenne, lasted over two months under inhuman conditions. According to several sources, Dutertre’s mission was carried out with indelicacy and ferocity.

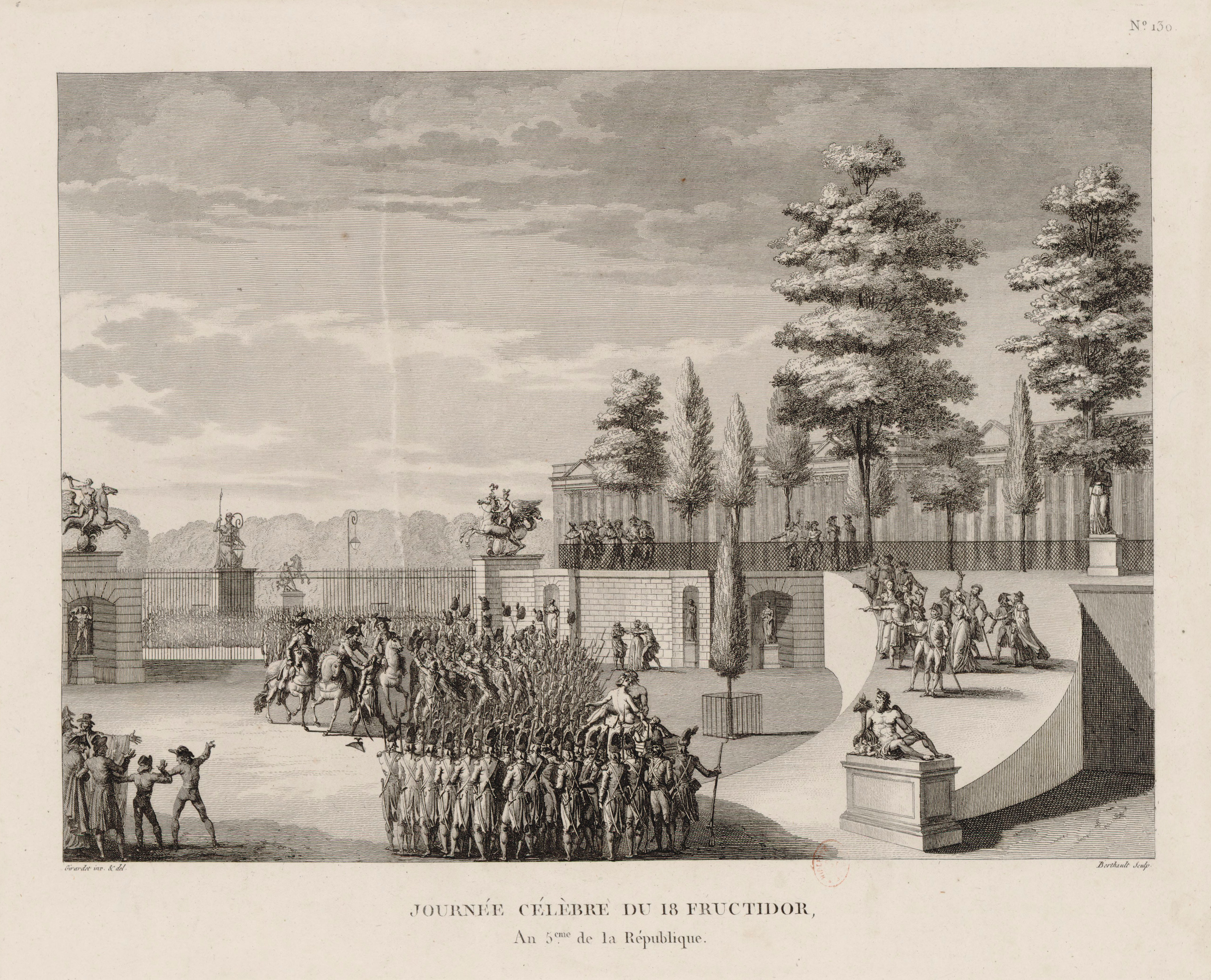
Journée célèbre du 18 fructidor an 5, Pierre-Gabriel Berthault, 1802

==== Accusations and Controversies ====
It was a difficult journey, full of incidents. A troop of 600 men—infanteers and cavalry—equipped with 10 field guns, escorted the carts carrying the sixteen deportees in four iron cages. General Dutertre, who commanded the column, was a drunkard whom a war council had once condemned for his banditry in Vendée and who had just been reinstated in his rank. Guillet was reluctant to follow such a leader: ‘You will watch him,’ he was told. Dutertre, with no other luggage than a handkerchief and a bottle of alcohol, installed himself in Guillet’s carriage, played the braggart, and tried to provoke an attack on the convoy that would give a pretext for massacring the prisoners and looting their belongings... Complaints from local administrations to the Directory, and from Adjutant Generals Guillet and Collin to the Minister, led to Dutertre’s recall after a week. — Bulletin mensuel de l'Académie des sciences et lettres de Montpellier, 1929, p. 105.

Dutertre was accused of mistreating the deportees, embezzling funds (800 louises were found on him, taken from the sum allocated for the convoy’s expenses), or plotting against them. He defended himself vigorously, publishing memoirs and justificatory documents to prove his good faith and adherence to instructions. He claimed to have spent his own money to improve transport and lodging conditions and to have prevented several assassination or escape attempts. Dutertre had many enemies, not only among those hostile to the Republic but also within the ranks of his fellow Republicans, whose accusations he repeatedly had to defend against.

==== Dismissal and Arrest ====
On 1 Complementary Day Year V (September 17, 1797), the French Directory relieved him of command and ordered his return from Lusignan to Paris. En route, he was insulted, assaulted, and finally arrested in Poitiers, then imprisoned in Paris at the Prison de l'Abbaye and later at Val-de-Grâce. Accused of embezzlement and complicity in dilapidation, he was eventually acquitted and released after four months of detention, thanks to the intervention of the Minister of War and the publication of his financial report, approved by the authorities. He was granted a pension for his wounds and services, but his reputation remained tarnished by the Fructidor deportation controversies. He denied being a torturer, insisting he had acted as a republican soldier, respectful of orders and humanity.

=== Thermidorian Convention ===
On 5 Vendémiaire Year 6 of the one and indivisible French Republic, the Executive Directory, at the request of the commander-in-chief of the Army of the Rhine, decrees that Brigadier General Dutertre shall be employed in one or the other of these armies. — Louis Marie de La Révellière-Lépeaux.

With protection, Dutertre was released after four months of detention and sent by Augereau to the Army of the Rhine under the orders of General François Joseph Lefebvre, who commanded the left wing. On 4 Brumaire Year VI, he was authorized to request retirement due to wounds and infirmities, with a pension of 3,000 livres. His wife, Catherine Courtet, obtained a divorce decree against him on February 17, 1799.

Returning to Paris for health reasons, Dutertre passed through the Mayenne region. On the night of July 22–23, 1799, near Saint-Cyr-en-Pail, he mistook three merchants for 300 Chouans and beat a retreat toward Javron. This episode was later ridiculed by Delelée, commissioner of Pré-en-Pail. Another version states that Dutertre and four cavalrymen dispersed the attackers and prevented the theft of transported goods.

=== Consulate ===
After the Coup of 18 Brumaire, he was ordered to leave Paris on February 9, 1800, and retire to Mayenne by February 26, 1800. On May 22, after seditious remarks, he was ordered to leave Paris within three days. He failed to comply; since the notification, his insults against the French Consulate had become more vehement and public. He ceased to be considered a military man, was suspended from his retirement pay, arrested, and imprisoned in the Prison de l'Abbaye. He was sent under surveillance to Douai on May 31, 1800. On 4 Brumaire Year VIII, Pierre-Mathieu Joubert, Prefect of Nord, denounced Dutertre as an immoral being and enemy of the government; his letter was forwarded to the Prefect of Police. He was then sent to Menin due to remarks he made against the prefect and the arms commander of Douai, Louis Jean Dessaubaz. Authorized to return to Paris on October 14, 1801, he was reinstated to his retirement pay and later exiled to Chaumont. In Year X (1802), he was involved in dubious financial speculations, buying Year VIII bonds at low prices.

=== First Empire ===
Bayonne, June 13, 1808. Generals Malet, Guillet, Dutertre, and some former officers of this ilk appear to have hatched a plot, which the police have thwarted and whose authors have been arrested. Conduct an investigation based on the list of retired officers paid in Paris and the first military division, and note all those who might be of this mindset. It would be good for you to set up a small military police to follow and watch them. Do not make any public scandal of these wretched anarchists; for the mere idea that they still exist would be enough to worry and disturb the tranquility. You must go down to the rank of captain, battalion chief, and other retired officers, who have always been known to oppose the government. I believe I have already ordered you to employ all of Guillaume Brune’s aides-de-camp in the army. Also send to the army the active officers who, without reason, are in Paris and are known to be in this spirit of opposition. Take care not to tolerate them in Paris under pretext of service. — Napoleon to General Henri Jacques Guillaume Clarke, Minister of War

Dutertre was retired on May 1, 1804. In 1804, during the Coronation of Napoleon, he was exiled to Douai and placed under the surveillance of the local commander, apparently for refusing to endorse Napoleon Bonaparte’s elevation to imperial dignity. The First French Empire placed him under surveillance in Domfront, Orne, in 1806, despite his protestations of devotion and his police reports..

In 1808, he was implicated in the First Conspiracy of General Claude François de Malet against Napoleon. In the summer of 1808, Malet, Dutertre, Hunet, and other officers were arrested and charged with anti-government conspiracy aimed at restoring the Republic.

On March 10, 1809, he appeared before the Mayenne court with a man named Noël for fraud and was sentenced to two years in prison. He escaped and fled France for Germany, following the army. He traveled successively through Austria, Hungary, and Prussia. He was declared under arrest by Napoleon and suspended from his imperial pension on June 13, 1810, by imperial decree. Arrested in Breslau in 1811 and in Bautzen in December 1811, he moved to Italy, where he drew attention for his claims about his relationships with Georges Cadoudal, Jean-Charles Pichegru, and Jeanne de Valois-Saint-Rémy, Countess of La Motte-Valois. He was accompanied by a woman claiming to be Mademoiselle Aglaé de Polignac. Arrested in Trieste on October 13, 1812, he was returned to France by the Gendarmerie and imprisoned in Lyon. His arrest order stated that, once his health permitted, he would be taken to Mayenne for trial.

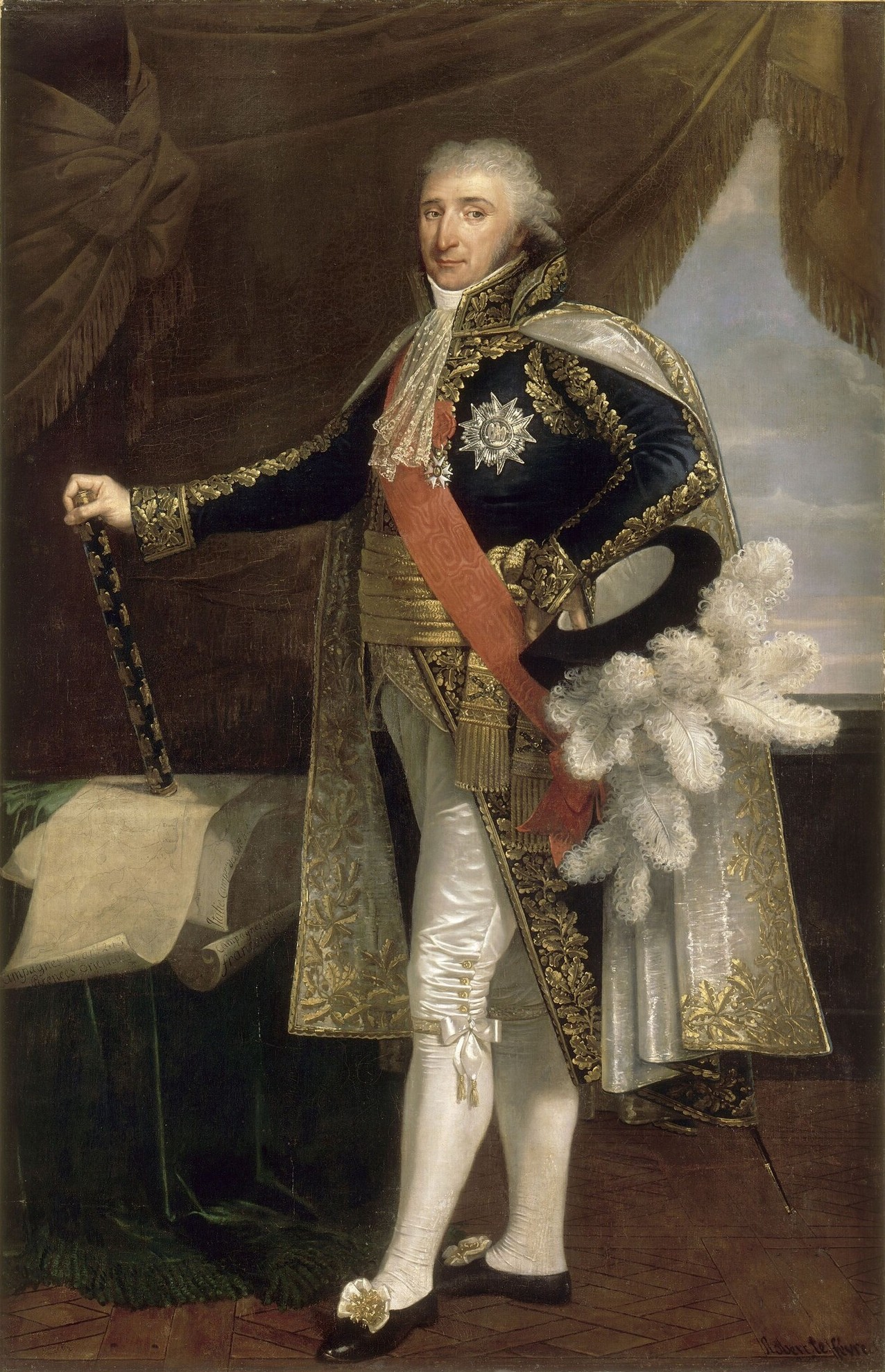
Maréchal Pierre Augereau, duc de Castiglione, Robert Lefèvre

He was released on March 19, 1814, and reinstated in his retirement pension. In 1814, he served in the Lyon army commanded by Marshal Pierre Augereau. He retired to Avignon on convalescence leave on March 27, 1814, "due to his wounds" and confirmed infirmities. There, he committed further fraud and showed signs of mental alienation.

=== Restoration ===
He returned to Paris under the First Restoration, and began calling himself Duport-Dutertre. In March 1815, he was a lieutenant in the 4th company of the 4th battalion of the Royal Volunteers during the Hundred Days, organized by Marshal Charles du Houx de Vioménil. He and the battalion were discharged on September 20, 1815.

Is the Dutertre family destined to be sacrificed? For the first Minister of Justice under the Revolution, in 1790 (Duport-Dutertre), was my relative; he was guillotined without trial on 8 Frimaire Year II; his only crime was being a patriot. — François Dutertre

In 1816, he again tried to pass himself off as a relative of Marguerite-Louis-François Duport-Dutertre and his companion, Catherine Courtet (with whom he had reconciled), claiming to be a Baroness of Broglie. Having left Verdun (where he had resided since April 8, 1816) in 1818 with a girl who lodged in his house, he left behind the memory of a scandalous life, constantly occupied with making dupes and sometimes succeeding. In 1820, he was in Soissons, where the king’s prosecutor inquired about his presence and requested information on "Mr. Dutertre" from the Minister of War.

In 1824, his presence was reported in Blois. From there, he petitioned the king for the Legion of Honor or the Order of Saint Louis, stating he had no preference. His request was denied by the prefect of Loir-et-Cher, where he was recognized from his time escorting the Fructidor deportees. The prefect warned the Minister of War against this candidate, who in his private life, conducted himself in a manner likely to alienate the esteem of honest people. He was again accused of fraud against several individuals and of practicing medicine without authorization. In 1825, he was sentenced to 10 years in prison and 10 years of surveillance. He petitioned the Chamber of Peers to support a request for clemency from the King. His trail was later found in Versailles in 1838. He was still living in Versailles on February 8, 1838, having resumed the name Du Port du Tertre, a flattering but too well-known patronymic in that city to avoid suspicion. He walked around wearing the Legion of Honor ribbon in his buttonhole, though he had never received the award. In 1838, he was convicted by the Versailles court for illegally wearing the Legion of Honor and filed a clemency petition. After the May 1839 Insurrection in Paris, Dutertre was in Villebernier, Maine-et-Loire, and was included on the list of the most dangerous individuals for the July Monarchy established by the sub-prefect of Saumur. The circumstances of his death remain unknown and are shrouded in legend. Robert Julien Billard de Veaux stated in his Memoirs that, later placed in Saint-Malo, he abandoned his wife (with whom he had reconciled) and children there. Alphonse-Victor Angot indicated that he arrived in Paris under the name Dutertre de la Bouverie (La Bouverie being land in Chantrigné he had acquired as a bien national from the de Hercé family). It is possible that his son was the secretary of Jacques-Joseph Corbière, Minister of the Interior under the Bourbon Restoration. Married to Perrine Lafond, he had with her Alfred Gustave François Dutertre (born November 9, 1840, in Belleville – died October 2, 1912), a captain commanding the gendarmerie in Saumur and a Chevalier of the Legion of Honor in 1888

== Death ==
The newspaper Le Commerce announced the death of Maréchal de Camp Duport-Dutertre in Villebernier on April 11, 1843, at the age of 83.

== Bibliography ==
- Départ du temple, pour Cayenne, des déportés des 17 et 18 fructidor, an V, avec les instructions curieuses données au général Dutertre, chargé de les conduire à leur destination, (Paris: Desenne, 1800).
