= Emmanuel Maximilien-Joseph Guidal =

French general

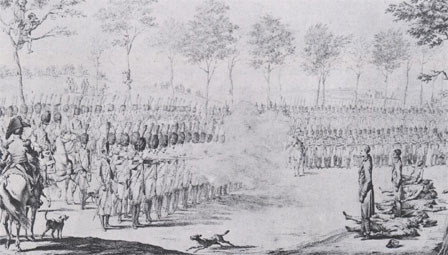
Execution of Guidal and fellow-conspirators

Emmanuel Maximilien-Joseph Guidal (French pronunciation: [emanɥɛl maksimiljɛ̃ ʒozɛf ɡidal]; 31 December 1764 – 29 October 1812) was a French general involved in the Malet Conspiracy which was aimed at toppling Napoleon I, who was away from Paris at the time.

== Life ==
Guidal was born on 31 December 1764. He may have been the General Guidal who, using treachery, lured Chouan rebel Louis de Frotté to Alençon, where the man was seized and executed. A supporter of the French Republic, Guidal disagreed with Napoleon I and, after conspiring with the British, was incarcerated in La Force prison.

During Malet's coup in 1812, Guidal was released from prison, along with General Victor Lahorie, by Claude Francois de Malet, a former general and leading conspirator in the coup. Guidal, with a detachment of National Guards, was to arrest Henri Clarke, the Minister of War, and Jean Jacques Régis de Cambacérès, the Archchancellor. Instead, Guidal accompanied Lahorie and participated in the arrest of the Duke of Rovigo, the French police minister, who was a personal enemy of Guidal.

The coup was eventually foiled, and, along with Malet and Lahorie, Guidal was tried by a council of war. The three generals were shot by a firing squad on 29 October 1812.
