= Claude François de Malet =

French aristocrat and soldier

Claude-François Malet
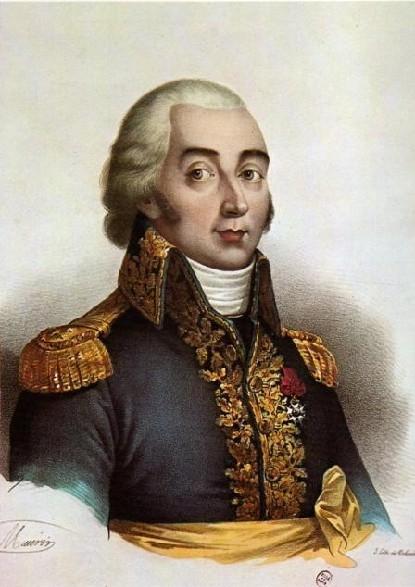
- Born: 28 June 1754; Dole, Jura
- Died: 31 October 1812 (aged 58); Grenelle
- Military career
- Allegiance: France
- Branch: Infantry
- Service years: 1790–1805

Claude François de Malet (French: [klod fʁɑ̃swa də malɛ]; 28 June 1754 – 31 October 1812) was born in Dole to an aristocratic family. He was executed by firing squad, six days after staging a failed republican coup d'état as Emperor Napoleon I returned from the disastrous Russian campaign in 1812.

== Before and during the French Revolution ==
Malet enlisted as a Musketeer at age seventeen as was common for a young nobleman of the ancien régime, but King Louis XVI disbanded the musketeer regiments in 1776 for budgetary reasons.

In 1790 Malet's family disinherited him for supporting the French Revolution, when he became commander of his home town's National Guard and celebrated the anniversary of the storming of the Bastille. Malet volunteered for the Revolutionary army when war broke out and was assigned to the 50th infantry regiment of the Army of the Rhine as a captain.

He was discharged in 1795, but reenlisted again in March 1797, first as Chief of Staff of the 6th division, then in 1799 as Chief of Staff of the Army of the Alps under the command of general Jean Étienne Championnet. After receiving honourable citations from both Championnet and general André Masséna for defending the Little St. Bernard Pass in August 1799, Malet was promoted to Brigadier General on October 19, 1799. He fought in the Helvetian Republic throughout 1801, until the fighting ended with the Second Coalition in 1802 by the treaties of Lunéville and Amiens.

== After the Directory ==
After the coups of the 30 Prairial and 18 Brumaire of year VIII that replaced the French Directory with the French Consulate, Malet voted against the referendum confirming Napoléon Bonaparte as First Consul. Malet was relegated to Bordeaux, then to Les Sables d'Olonne, as his opposition to Bonaparte became even more vehement, although he became Commander of the Légion d'honneur during these years.

In 1805 he was discharged from active duty; Malet then resigned after Napoleon seized total power and crowned himself emperor. He was appointed Governor of Pavia in the Napoleonic Kingdom of Italy. Viceroy Eugène de Beauharnais expelled him on allegations of black market activities and propaganda, and he was interned in the La Force Prison from July 1, 1807, to May 30, 1808. Released without trial, he was jailed again the next year on suspicion of belonging to the Philadelphes, a republican and anti-Bonapartist Masonic society. He remained under house arrest in Paris from July 1810, until his escape on October 23, 1812.

== Coup d'état of 1812 ==
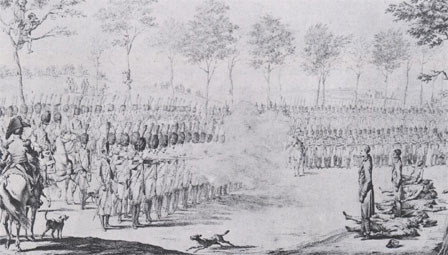
Execution of Malet and his accomplices

During his detention Malet conceived of and planned Napoleon's overthrow in a daring coup d'état. The plan was simple: on October 23, 1812, during the Emperor's absence on the Russian front, Malet planned to announce the death of Napoleon and to establish a provisional government. Malet decided to proclaim his death via the use of forged documentation, hoping the plausible declaration would be believable.

Malet's proposed provisional government would be composed of Mathieu de Montmorency, Alexis de Noailles, General Moreau as vice president, Lazare Carnot as president, Marshal Augereau, ex-legislator Bigonnet, Count Frochot, Prefect of the Seine, ex-legislator Florent Guiot, Destutt de Tracy, Malet himself, Vice-Admiral Truguet, Senator Volney, and Senator Garrat. The forces involved in the coup were the Gendarmerie forces of Paris (which were dissolved thereafter and formed the 134th Line Infantry Regiment) and the 10th Cohort of the French National Guard.

Malet prepared complex instructions and forged documents for his accomplices. This preliminary work was immense, since it was necessary to give each accomplice an important role, specific instructions, and forged copies of the senatus consultum and the proclamations. As soon as a set of instructions was completely prepared, the dispatch was closed, sealed, numbered and entrusted to the custody of a Spanish priest who lived in Saint-Gilles street, close to the barracks of the 10th National Guard Cohort.

On the night of the October 23, Malet escaped his captivity. Dressed in a general's uniform, he presented himself at the La Force prison and, using forged orders, obtained the release of Generals Victor Lahorie and Emmanuel Maximilien-Joseph Guidal, to whom he announced Napoleon's demise on October 7 at the Russian front near Moscow. He then convinced Lahorie and Guidal that immediate action was necessary and showed the forged documents leading them to believe the Senate had already reacted to the death of the Emperor.

In the pre-dawn hours of October 23 Malet and his accomplices went to the barracks of the Gendarmerie. Malet awoke commanders and soldiers announced the Emperor's death and presented his forged documents as evidence. According to the "orders" in the forged documents, Malet had the troops take up their weapons and dispatched detachments of the 10th Cohort in columns to various locations to make arrests.

A detachment of the 10th Cohort, led by Lahorie, went to the residence of the Duke of Rovigo, Minister of the Police. The Duke was taken by surprise and conveyed to La Force prison, while another detachment arrested the prefect of the police force. A third column went to the town hall of Paris and, while the troops took positions in place de Grève, the commanders took the key of the Midsummer's Day alarm bell, called the prefect Frochot and prepared the room for a provisional government.

The death of the Emperor was believed throughout Paris, and Malet settled into the offices of the district general of the Place Vendôme, which offered the facilities necessary to play his part of commander. When General Pierre-Augustin Hulin, commander of the Paris Garrison, requested verification of the senatorial documents, Malet shot and injured him. Finally, Malet's actions were ended when a senior military police officer, Colonel Jean Doucet, recognized that the new general of the Senate in fact was the prisoner Malet. Doucet disarmed Malet, returned him to prison, and ordered the 10th Cohort back to its barracks.

== Consequences of the Malet Conspiracy ==
Malet's plan was skillfully conceived. It focused on the weakness of Napoleon's imperial dictatorship government, and calculated the consequences of the French passive obedience. Although unsuccessful, Malet's attempted coup d'état can be seen as revealing a fatal weakness of the new dynasty. This coup d'état caused the anger of Napoleon I because it exposed the weakness of French allegiance to the Bonaparte family as a dynasty: nobody had had the idea to shout, "Napoleon died! Long Live Napoleon II!" On the other hand, the coup attempt was in fact thwarted.

A total of 23 civilians and officers, including Malet, Guidal and Lahorie, were tried on October 29, 1812, before a council of war for treason and all were convicted. All but 2 were executed on the plain of Grenelle on October 31.

The conspiracy also led to strained relations between the Ministry of War and the Ministry of Police.
