= Malet coup of 1812 =

Attempted coup d'état against Emperor of France Napoleon I

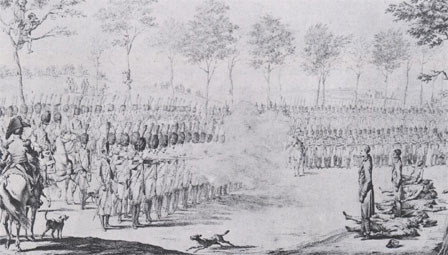
- Execution of Malet
- Date: 23 October 1812
- Location: Paris, France
- Participants: Claude François de Malet; Victor Lahorie; Emmanuel Maximilien-Joseph Guidal
- Outcome: Suppression of the coup Executions of Malet, Lahorie & Guidal

The Malet coup of 1812 was an attempted coup d'état in Paris, France, aimed at removing Napoleon I, then campaigning in Russia, from power. The coup was engineered by General Claude François de Malet, a republican who had consistently opposed Napoleon.

Malet used forged documents to convince French National Guard officers in Paris that Napoleon had died, enabling him to take control of elements of the guard and use them to arrest various government ministers. However, when Malet attempted to take control of the Paris garrison, an officer recognised the documents as fakes and arrested him.

After Malet's arrest, the coup collapsed, and the leading conspirators were executed.

== Malet's opposition to Napoleon ==
Claude François de Malet was born in 1754. He distinguished himself in the French Revolutionary Wars and slowly became disenchanted with Napoleon Bonaparte. Malet opposed the Corsican general's rise to the position of First Consul. Malet, by 1804 a brigadier general, resigned his commission after Napoleon was crowned Emperor of the French.

After his resignation, Malet was made governor of Pavia, then of Rome, both of which were under French control. After Napoleon's stepson, Eugène de Beauharnais, Viceroy of Italy accused Malet of conspiring against Napoleon, he was removed from his position and imprisoned in France. Malet was permitted to retire to a sanatorium in 1812, at the request of his wife.

== The conspiracy ==
While at the sanatorium, Malet met with several agents of the House of Bourbon, who were working to replace the First Empire with a restored monarchy. Despite these connections, Malet appears to have had strong republican, rather than royalist, leanings. At the sanatorium he began to plan a coup to overthrow the emperor. Napoleon was absent from France in 1812, commanding his troops in the invasion of Russia, providing Malet with an ideal opportunity to strike. With several others, he crafted detailed plans for a seizure of power, which was scheduled for late October. Malet and his co-conspirators planned a provisional government to be installed after the coup. Lazare Carnot was to be appointed interim president.

== Coup d'état ==
=== Seizure of power in Paris ===
At 4 a.m. on 23 October 1812, Malet escaped from his captivity, donning a general's uniform. He approached Colonel Gabriel Soulier, who commanded the 10th Cohort of the French National Guard, informing the colonel that Napoleon had died while in Russia. Several forged documents convinced Soulier of the accuracy of Malet's claims, and the colonel, ill and stunned by his own "promotion" to general, which was among the forged papers, obeyed Malet when told to assemble the cohort. Soulier did not question Malet, even when the latter announced his intention to arrest several top officials, and the cohort followed its commander's example and submitted to the recent prisoner, following him to La Force Prison.

At La Force, Malet ordered the release of two imprisoned generals, Victor Lahorie and Maximilian-Joseph Guidal. The guards obeyed him, and the generals, republicans like Malet, were convinced to join the coup. Malet sent Lahorie to arrest the Duke of Rovigo, the Minister of Police, while Guidal, with a company of National Guards, was to seize General Henri Clarke (Duke of Feltre), the Minister of War, and Archchancellor Cambacérès (Duke of Parma). Guidal, an enemy of Rovigo, insisted that he be allowed to accompany Lahorie. The two generals awoke Rovigo and placed him in La Force, neglecting to arrest the other two officials.

Other senior officials, such as the Paris prefect of police Étienne-Denis Pasquier, were arrested, and Lahorie was given the position of Minister of General Police. As this occurred, Malet confronted General Pierre-Augustin Hulin, the commander of the Paris garrison, in the latter's home. The general listened to the conspirator, who informed him that he (Hulin) had been relieved of his garrison command and that he was to turn over the seal of the 1st Division, which was located in Paris. Hulin demanded to see the official papers that would authorize such actions, whereupon Malet shot him in the jaw.

=== Suppression of the coup ===
Malet then proceeded to the military headquarters opposite Hulin's home. There, he met with the senior officer on duty there, Colonel Pierre Doucet. Doucet was suspicious, however, because the letters presented to him that referenced Napoleon's death stated that the Emperor had died on 7 October. Doucet had knowledge of letters written by Napoleon that had been sent after that date. The colonel also recognized Malet as a sanatorium inmate, and, once he was alone in his office with the general, overpowered him. Malet was placed under arrest, while Doucet ordered the National Guard's 10th Cohort to return to its barracks. He then released Rovigo and other officials imprisoned by the conspirators, and informed the Minister of War, Clarke, of these developments.

Clarke, whose ministry was experiencing strained relations with that of Rovigo, sent a detachment of the Imperial Guard to protect the Ministry of Police and set about restoring order to Paris and, at the same time, making an effort to portray Rovigo as incompetent. One of Clarke's first actions was to inform Archchancellor Cambacérès of the coup, urging the man to bring Empress Marie-Louise and Napoleon's heir, the infant King of Rome, to Saint-Cloud.

=== Aftermath ===
Malet, Lahorie, and Guidal were tried before a council of war and were executed by firing squad on 29 October. Others, including Colonel Soulier, who had been tricked into enabling the coup, were shot on 31 October. Colonel Jean François Rabbe, commander of the Paris Guard (which had also been fooled into supporting the conspirators) was spared execution. The 10th Cohort was sent to Bremen, and Minister of War Clarke began to investigate all general officers present in Paris on 23 October, suspending from service those who he thought had acted in a way that showed support for Malet. Napoleon, rushing back to Paris from Russia, did not punish Rovigo—to the disappointment of his rival, Clarke. Clarke had been spoken poorly of by Napoleon, who wondered why after hearing of his supposed death, the minister did not proclaim Napoleon II as the new Emperor.
