= List of units of the Army of the Kingdom of Naples (Napoleonic) =

Coat of Arms of the Kingdom of Naples under Joachim Murat.

The Army of the Kingdom of Naples was, by the time's standards, a relatively sizeable force. At its height in 1815, it numbered close to 95,000 men. This large formation was modelled heavily on the French Grande Armée, and although the success of its service in the Peninsular War is questionable, the Neapolitan Army is still remembered as one of the better-organised examples of armies from Napoleon's client states.

Below is a mostly complete (with a few obscure exceptions) list of various units serving in the Murattian Neapolitan Army in the Napoleonic Wars. The units are listed by their respective army branches, i.e. Guard infantry and engineers. All of the regiments and units pertaining to the Guard had the phrase "della Guardia Reale" (Italian: 'of the Royal Guard') after their official name, to indicate their status as part of the Royal Household Guard.

== Royal Guard ==
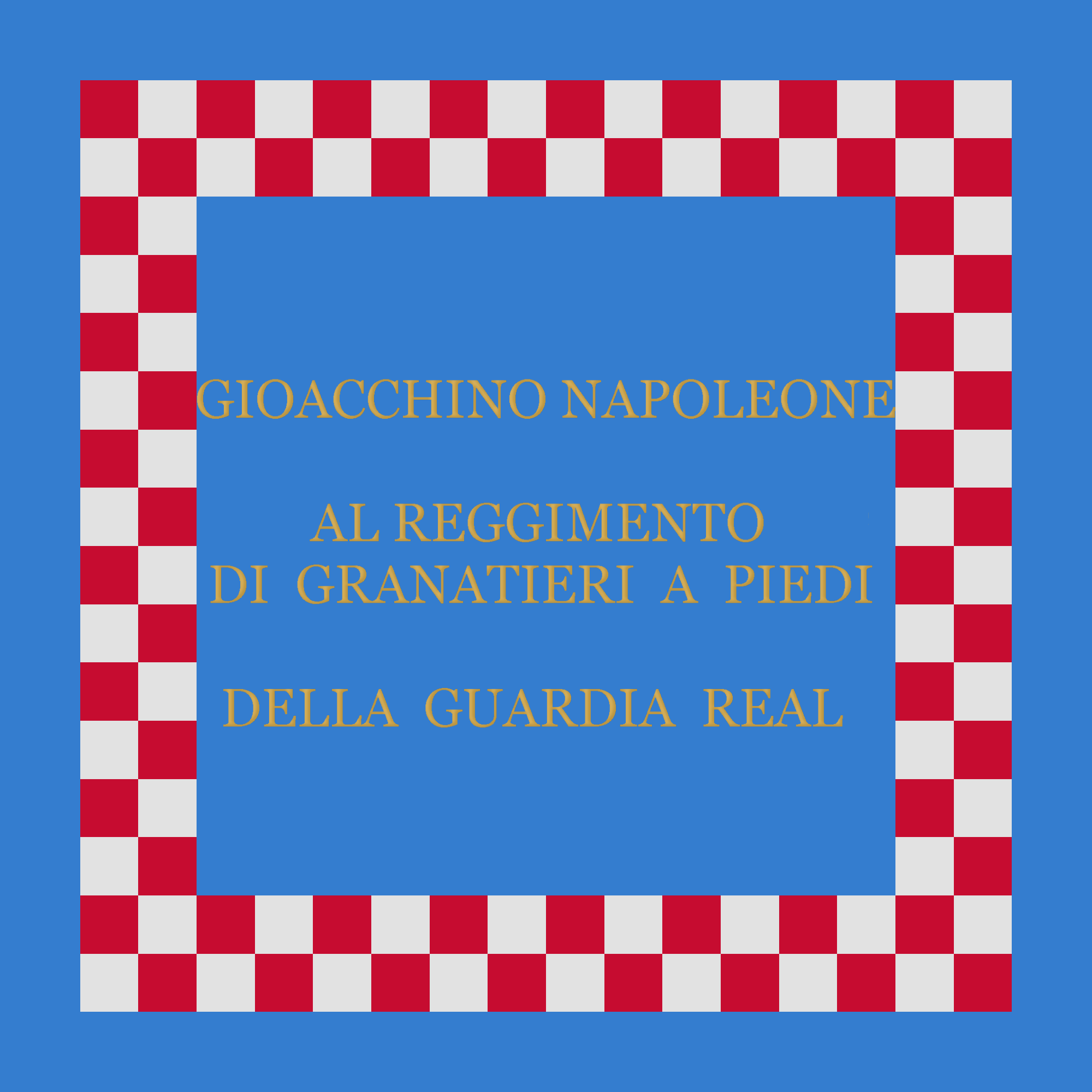
Regimental flag of the Neapolitan Guard Grenadiers.

=== Guard Infantry ===
In 1815, the Guard Infantry Division totalled 57 companies organised into 4 regiments (9 battalions) and totalled 8,135 men.

| English name | Italian Name | Formation Date | Disbanded | Major Nationalities (other than Neapolitan) — if applicable | Notes |
|---|---|---|---|---|---|
| Regiment of Foot Grenadiers | Reggimento di Granatieri a Piedi | 11 July 1806 | 20 May 1815 | French, German and "other foreigners" | Personal Guard of the King of Naples. Modelled on the French Old Guard. |
| 1st Regiment of Vélités of Foot | 1° Reggimento di Veliti a Piedi | 15 July 1811 | May 1815 | | Originally formed as the Vélité Hunters converted 15 July 1811 as Foot Velites, thereby becoming the 1st Velites. |
| 2nd Regiment of Vélités of Foot | 2° Reggimento di Veliti a Piedi | 15 July 1811 | May 1815 | | Converted from the old Guard Voltigeurs in 1811. |
| Regiment of Vélité-Hunters | Reggimento Veliti Cacciatori | 22 September 1808 | 15 July 1811 | | Originally formed as the Company of Chosen Civic Hunters in 1806, and expanded to a regiment in 1808 after their conversion. Became the 1st Regiment of Velites of Foot on 15 July 1811. |
| Voltigeur Battalion | Battaglione Volteggiatori | 30 May 1806 | 15 July 1811 | French | Disbanded in 1811 following the reorganisation of the guard. Re-raised in 1814, but the lineage wasn't transferred (see 12th Line below under Infantry and Voltigeur Regiment) |
| Regiment of Voltigeurs | Reggimento di Volteggiatori | 29 September 1814 | May 1815 | | Formed as the 12th Infantry Regiment, later converted to the Guard Voltigeurs. See 12th Infantry under "Line Infantry" for more information. |
| Company of Chosen Civilian Hunters | Compagnia Caccciatori Civici Scelti | 1806 | 22 September 1808 | | Formed as a civilian unit, then transferred to the Guard, and finally expanded in 1808 into the Regiment of Velite Hunters. |

=== Guard Cavalry ===
| English name | Italian Name | Formation Date | Disbanded | Major Nationalities (other than Neapolitan) — if applicable | Notes |
|---|---|---|---|---|---|
| Regiment of Honour Guards | Reggimento delle Guardie d'Onore | 5 August 1809 | 10 March 1813 | | Redesignated as the Regiment of Life Guards in 1813. |
| Regiment of Life Guards | Reggimento Guardie del Corpo | 10 March 1813 | 28 July 1814 | | Redesignated back as the Honour Guards, soon reduced to a company and the remainder of the companies sent to the Guard Lancers Regiment. |
| Regiment of Lancers | Reggimento dei Lancieri | 1 October 1814 | May 1815 | | Formed from the three squadrons initially intended for the Honour Guards Regiment. |
| Regiment of Cuirassiers | Reggimento Corazzieri | 18 March 1813 | May 1815 | | |
| Regiment of Chevaulegers | Reggimento Cavalleggeri | 30 July 1806 | 10 July 1808 | French | Raised as an early, impromptu cavalry regiment in Joseph's army in 1806 from French cavalrymen. Eventually disbanded in 1808. |
| Regiment of Chevaulegers | Reggimento Cavallegeri | 6 September 1808 | May 1815 | Berg (German) | Raised as the Regiment of Berg Lancers, later transferred to the Neapolitan Guard. Not to be confused with the other Chevauleger regiment mentioned above; although these two bore the same name, they did not exist during the same time at once. |
| Regiment of Hussars | Reggimento Ussari | 11 April 1813 | May 1815 | | Raised from the Mounted Velites. |
| Regiment of Mounted Velites | Reggimento Veliti a Cavallo | 22 September 1808 | 11 April 1813 | | Originally designated as a Corps rather than a regiment. |
| Company of Mounted Velites of Clary | Compagnia Veliti a Cavallo Clary | 22 November 1806 | September 1808 | | Raised as an independent bodyguard for Marie Julie Clary, King Joseph Bonaparte's wife. Later merged with the Tascher Cavalry to form the Corps of Mounted Velites. |
| Selected Squadron of Gendarmerie | Squadrone Gendarmeria Scelta | 30 September 1806 | 18 March 1813 | | Initially raised as a Corps of Elite Gendarmerie. Only used for military police duty. |

=== Supporting Arms ===
| English name | Italian Name | Formation Date | Disbanded | Notes |
|---|---|---|---|---|
| Royal Halderbiers of Naples | Alabardieri Reali di Napoli | | | Formed as palace guards for King Joseph Bonaparte. |
| Battalion of Veterans | Battaglione dei Veterani | 21 April 1809 | May 1815 | Originally a company; created for invalids and old soldiers unfit for active service. |
| Royal Guard Sailors Battalion | Battaglione Marinai | 30 September 1806 | 10 July 1808 | |
| Horse Artillery of the Royal Guard | Artiglieria a Cavallo della Guardia | 22 September 1809 | May 1815 | Regiment sized |
| Foot Artillery of the Royal Guard | Artiglieria a piedi della Guardia Reale | 30 September 1806 | 10 July 1809 | Later expanded into two separate artillery regiments. |
| Artillery Train of the Royal Guard | Treno di Artiglieria (della Guardia Reale) | 30 September 1806 | May 1815 | |

== Cavalry of the Line ==
During the 1813 reorganisation of the Neapolitan Army, the light cavalry were converted to line cavalry.

=== Light Cavalry ===
| English name | Italian Name | Formation Date | Disbanded | Notes |
|---|---|---|---|---|
| 1st Regiment of Horse Hunters | 1° Cacciatori a Cavallo | 18 February 1806 | 10 March 1813 | Reorganised into the 1st Regiment of Chevaulegers |
| 2nd Regiment of Horse Hunters | 2° Cacciatori a Cavallo | 4 June 1806 | 10 March 1813 | Reorganised into the 2nd Regiment of Chevaulegers |

| English name | Italian Name | Formation Date | Disbanded | Notes |
|---|---|---|---|---|
| 1st Regiment of Chevaulegers | 1° Reggimento di Cavallegeri | 25 December 1810 | 10 March 1813 | Transferred to become the 3rd, and remade from the men of the old 1st Horse Hunters |
| 2nd Regiment of Chevaulegers | 2° Reggimento di Cavallegeri | 10 March 1813 | May 1815 | Formed from the old 2nd Horse Hunters |
| 3rd Regiment of Chevaulegers | 3° Reggimento di Cavallegeri | 10 March 1813 | May 1815 | Formed from the old 1st Cavalry Regiment |
| 4th Regiment of Chevaulegers | 4° Reggimento di Cavallegeri | 7 July 1814 | 10 March 1813 | |
| Municipal Guard Squadron of Naples | Squadrone Guardia Municipale di Napoli | 26 September 1809 | 25 December 1810 | |

== Infantry of the Line ==
=== Line Infantry ===
| English name | Italian Name | Formation Date | Disbanded | Title (if any) | Notes |
|---|---|---|---|---|---|
| 1st Regiment of the Line | 1° Reggimento Fanteria di Linea | 13 June 1806 | 1811 | "del Re" | Formed during Joseph's reign. |
| 2nd Regiment of the Line | 2° Reggimento Fanteria di Linea | 13 June 1806 | 1811 | "della Regina" | Formed during Joseph's reign. |
| 3rd Regiment of the Line | 3° Reggimento Fanteria di Linea | 10 March 1809 | May 1815 | "del Principe Real" | Raised by decree of Murat in 1809. |
| 4th Regiment of the Line | 4° Reggimento Fanteria di Linea | 27 August 1809 | May 1815 | "Real Sannita" | Raised by decree of Murat in 1809. |
| 5th Regiment of the Line | 5° Reggimento Fanteria di Linea | 12 September 1809 | May 1815 | "Real Calabria" | First regiment to receive a title. |
| 6th Regiment of the Line | 6° Reggimento Fanteria di Linea | 10 December 1810 | May 1815 | "di Napoli" | |
| 7th Regiment of the Line | 7° Reggimento Fanteria di Linea | 17 December 1810 | 1812 | "Real Africano" | Formed from the "Corpo Reale Africano", a Negro unit from Saint-Domingue in French service |
| 8th Regiment of the Line | 8° Reggimento Fanteria di Linea | 14 October 1811 | 1814 | "Principe Luciano" | Made up from the two Neapolitan battalions serving in Spain and the remnants of the 2nd Light Regiment at Saragossa |
| 9th Regiment of the Line | 9° Reggimento Fanteria di Linea | 28 June 1813 | May 1815 | | Raised from the "Reggimento Provvisorio". |
| 10th Regiment of the Line | 10° Reggimento Fanteria di Linea | 8 March 1814 | May 1815 | | |
| 11th Regiment of the Line | 11° Reggimento Fanteria di Linea | 3 May 1814 | May 1815 | | |
| 12th Regiment of the Line | 12° Reggimento Fanteria di Linea | 29 June 1814 | 29 September 1814 | "della Marca" | Brought into the Royal Guard in September 1814 as the Regiment of Voltiegeurs, later reformed out of Italian veterans. |
| Neuchatel Battalion | Battaglione Neuchatel | 4 October 1808 | 19 May 1815 | | Formed in 4 October of Swiss Mercenaries who enlisted in Neapolitan Service. |
| MacDonald's Elite Regiment | Reggimento scelto MacDonald | 12 January 1813 | 10 June 1813 | | Formed through the remnants of the Neapolitan troops in the Grande Armée for service in Germany under command of General Macdonald. It was formed from all of the elite companies of the Neapolitan regiments (5th, 6th and 7th line) serving in Germany and the Marines of the Guard. |

=== Light Infantry ===
| English name | Italian Name | Formation Date | Disbanded | Major Nationality (other than Neapolitan) — if applicable | Notes |
|---|---|---|---|---|---|
| Royal Corsican Regiment | Reggimento Real Corso | 30 June 1806 (transferred from French service) | 16 February 1813 | Corsican | Formed from the French "Legion Corse". |
| 1st Light Infantry Regiment | 1° Reggimento di Fanteria Leggera | 16 February 1813 | May 1815 | Corsican | Formed from the old Corsican regiment, designated as a formal light infantry regiment. |
| 2nd Light Infantry Regiment | 2° Reggimento di Fanteria Leggera | 16 February 1806 | May 1815 | | Originally the 1st Light Regiment - during the reorganisation of 1813, it was redesignated as the 2nd. |
| 3rd Light Infantry Regiment | 3° Reggimento di Fanteria Leggera | 16 February 1806 | May 1815 | | Originally the 2nd Light Regiment - during the reorganisation of 1813, it was redesignated as the 3rd. |
| 4th Light Infantry Regiment | 4° Reggimento di Fanteria Leggera | 20 February 1812 | May 1815 | | Originally a provisional light infantry regiment, reorganised into the 4th Light Regiment in 1813. |

== Reserve Units ==
In 1815, the Army of the Reserve numbered 91 companies split into various gendarmerie and police legions and units.

=== Provincial Infantry ===
| English name | Italian Name | Formation Date | Disbanded | Notes |
|---|---|---|---|---|
| Provincial (District) Chosen Companies | Compagnie Scelte Provinciali (Distrettuali) | 12 June 1812 | | |
| Provincial Battalions | Battaglioni Provinciali | 10 January 1815 | May 1815 | Formed for service in the Neapolitan War |
| 1st Provincial Regiment of the Line | 1° Reggimento Provvisori di Linea | March 1815 | May 1815 | Formed for service in the Neapolitan War |
| 2nd Provincial Regiment of the Line | 2° Reggimento Provvisori di Linea | March 1815 | May 1815 | Formed for service in the Neapolitan War |
| 3rd Provincial Regiment of the Line | 3° Reggimento Provvisori di Linea | March 1815 | May 1815 | Formed for service in the Neapolitan War |
| 4th Provincial Regiment of the Line | 4° Reggimento Provvisori di Linea | March 1815 | May 1815 | Formed for service in the Neapolitan War |
| 5th Provincial Regiment of the Line | 5° Reggimento Provvisori di Linea | March 1815 | May 1815 | Formed for service in the Neapolitan War |

=== Royal Gendarmerie ===
| English name | Italian Name | Formation Date | Disbanded | Notes |
|---|---|---|---|---|
| 1st Legion (of Naples) | 1° Legione di Napoli | 3 March 1809 | 13 September 1816 | Formed through the expansion of the old Legion of Naples |
| 2nd Legion (of Bari) | 2° Legione di Bari | 3 March 1809 | 13 September 1816 | Formed through the expansion of the old Legion of Naples and the Legion of Foggia. |
| 3rd Legion (of Salerno) | 3° Legione di Salerno | 3 March 1809 | 13 September 1816 | Formed through the expansion of the old Legion of Naples |
| Legion of Naples | Legione di Napoli | 5 January 1808 | 3 March 1809 | Formed through the merger of the old 1st and 2nd Legions |
| Calabrian Armiger Hunters | Armigeri Cacciatori Calabresi | 16 April 1807 | | Formed to combat brigands and rebels in Calabria |
| Auxiliary Gendarmerie | Gendarmeria Ausiliaria | 23 November 1807 | | Originally formed as the Royal Armigers to combat brigands. |
| Provincial Infantry Companies | Compagnie Provinciali di Fanteria | 4 May 1810 | | |
| Gendarmerie of the Royal Navy | Gendarmeria Reale di Marina | 30 March 1810 | | |
| Guard of Customs and border | Guardia dei Dazi Indiretti | 24 February 1809 | | Established to guard the borders and enforce tax collection and deal with brigands. |

=== Provincial Legions ===
| English name | Italian Name | Formation Date | Disbanded |
|---|---|---|---|
| Provincial Legion of Central Calabria | Legione Provinciale di Calabria Citra | 15 May 1806 | May 1815 |
| Provincial Legion of Upper Calabria | Legione Provinciale di Calabria Ultra | 15 May 1806 | May 1815 |
| Provincial Legion of Central Abruzzo | Legione Provinciale di Abruzzo Citra | 15 May 1806 | May 1815 |
| 1st Provincial Legion of Upper Abruzzo | Legione Provinciale di Abruzzo Ultra I | 15 May 1806 | May 1815 |
| 2nd Provincial Legion of Upper Abruzzo | Legione Provinciale di Abruzzo Ultra II | 15 May 1806 | May 1815 |
| Provincial Legion of Molise | Legione Provinciale di Molise | 15 May 1806 | May 1815 |
| Provincial Legion of Basilicata | Legione Provinciale di Basilicata | 15 May 1806 | May 1815 |
| Provincial Legion of Capitanata | Legione Provinciale di Capitanata | 15 May 1806 | May 1815 |
| Provincial Legion of Bari | Legione Provinciale di Bari | 15 May 1806 | May 1815 |
| Provincial Legion of Otranto | Legione Provinciale di Otranto | 15 May 1806 | May 1815 |
| Provincial Legion of Naples | Legione Provinciale di Napoli | 15 May 1806 | May 1815 |
| Provincial Legion of Lavoro | Legione Provinciale di Lavoro | 15 May 1806 | May 1815 |
| Provincial Legion of the Upper Principality | Legione Provinciale di Principato Ultra | 15 May 1806 | May 1815 |
| Provincial Legion of Central Principality | Legione Provinciale di Principato Citra | 15 May 1806 | May 1815 |
| Civic Regiment of Circeo | Reggimento Civico di Circeo | 1809 | May 1815 |
| National Guard of Benevento | Guardia Nazionale di Benevento | 1813 | 1814 |
| Departmental Legion of the Tronto | Legione Dipartimentale delTronto | 1814 | May 1815 |
| Departmental Legion of the Musone | Legione Dipartimentale del Musone | 1814 | May 1815 |
| Departmental Legion of the Metauro | Legione Dipartimentale del Metauro | 1814 | May 1815 |
| National Guard of the King | Guardia Nazionale del Re | 1814 & 1815 | May 1815 |

=== Provisional Units ===
| English name | Italian Name | Formation Date | Disbanded | Notes |
|---|---|---|---|---|
| Italian Volunteers Brigade | Brigata Volontari Italiani | April 1815 | May 1815 | Formed for service in the Neapolitan War. |
| Calabrian Free Corps | Corpo Francho Calabrese | September 1806 | April 1808 | Formed as a counter-brigand/insurgency unit in Calabria. |
| Regiment of Veterans | Reggimento Veterani | 22 December 1806 | May 1815 | Originally designated as a Corps. |
| Mountain Hunters Battalion of the Principality of Citra | Battaglione Cacciatori di Montagna del Principato Citra | 4 October 1806 | 25 August 1809 | |
| Selected Battalion of Italian Officers | Battaglione Scelto degli Ufficiali Italiani | April 1815 | May 1815 | Formed for service in the Neapolitan War from officers of the defunct Kingdom of Italy. |
| Franca Guides of Abruzzi | Compagnia Franca Guide degli Abruzzi | 5 September 1806 | 26 March 1808 | |
| Franche Voltigeurs of Abruzzi | Compagnie Franche Volteggiatori Abruzzesi | 18 December 1806 | 1807 | |

== Supporting Arms ==
=== Artillery ===
| English name | Italian Name | Formation Date | Disbanded | Notes |
|---|---|---|---|---|
| 1st Regiment of Foot Artillery | 1° Reggimento di Artiglieria a Piedi | December 1810 | May 1815 | Formed from the old Foot Artillery Regiment |
| 2nd Regiment of Foot Artillery | 2° Reggimento di Artiglieria a Piedi | 5 January 1814 | May 1815 | Formed through the expansion of the old 1st Foot Artillery |
| Regiment of Foot Artillery | Reggimento Artiglieria a Piedi | 31 July 1806 | December 1810 | Formed from the expansion of the old Artillery Companies. |
| Companies of Artillery | Compagnie d'Artiglieri | March 1806 | July 1806 | Expanded to form the new Regiment of Artillery in 1806 |

| English name | Italian Name | Formation Date | Disbanded |
Artillery Companies of Castelnuovo
| 1st Artillery Company | 1° Compagnia Artiglieri | 11 March 1806 | May 1815 |
| 2nd Artillery Company | 2° Compagnia Artiglieri | 14 July 1813 | May 1815 |
| 1st Company of Gunsmiths | 1a Compagnia di Armaioli | 16 December 1808 | May 1815 |
| 2nd Company of Gunsmiths | 2a Compagnia di Armaioli | 30 October 1809 | May 1815 |
| 3rd Company of Gunsmiths | 3a Compagnia di Armaioli | 30 October 1809 | May 1815 |
Coastal Artillery Companies
| Gaeta Company | Compagnia di Artiglieria di Gaeta | 18 August 1807 | May 1815 |
| Baia Company | Compagnia di Artiglieria di Baia | 18 August 1807 | May 1815 |
| Pozzuoli Company | Compagnia di Artiglieria di Pozzuoli | 18 August 1807 | May 1815 |
| Castellammare Company | Compagnia di Artiglieria di Castellammare | 18 August 1807 | May 1815 |
| Sorrento Company | Compagnia di Artiglieria di Sorrento | 18 August 1807 | May 1815 |
| Salerno Company | Compagnia di Artiglieria di Salerno | 18 August 1807 | May 1815 |
| Calabrian Company | Compagnia di Artiglieria di Calabria | 18 August 1807 | May 1815 |
| Taranto Company | Compagnia di Artiglieria di Taranto | 18 August 1807 | May 1815 |
| Otranto Company | Compagnia di Artiglieria di Otranto | 18 August 1807 | May 1815 |
| Bari Company | Compagnia di Artiglieria di Bari | 18 August 1807 | May 1815 |
| Manfredonia Company | Compagnia di Artiglieria di Manfredonia | 18 August 1807 | May 1815 |
| Pescara Company | Compagnia di Artiglieria di Pescara | 18 August 1807 | May 1815 |

=== Artillery Train & Supply ===
| English name | Italian Name | Formation Date | Disbanded | Notes |
|---|---|---|---|---|
| Artillery Train Regiment | Reggimento del Treno d'Artiglieria | 26 May 1814 | May 1815 | Formed through the merger of the 1st and 2nd Artillery Train battalions |
| 1st Battalion of the Artillery Train | 1° Battaglione del Treno d'Artiglieria | 30 July 1807 | 26 May 1814 | Formed through the expansion and merger of the Compagnies of the Artillery Train |
| 2nd Battalion of the Artillery Train | 2° Battaglione del Treno d'Artiglieria | 2 December 1813 | 26 May 1814 | |
| Companies of the Artillery Train | Compagnia del Treno d'Artiglieria | 7 October 1806 | 30 July 1807 | Expanded to form the 1st Artillery Train Battalion |
| Company of Military Equipment | Compagnia di Equipaggi Militari | 21 May 1813 | 2 December 1813 | |

=== Engineers & Miners ===
| English name | Italian Name | Formation Date | Disbanded | Notes |
|---|---|---|---|---|
| Regiment of Sappers and Miners | Reggimento Zappatori e Minatori | 26 May 1814 | May 1815 | Formed through the merger of the 1st and 2nd battalions of sappers and miners |
| 1st Battalion of Sappers and Miners | 1° Battaglione Zappatori e Minatori | 21 April 1809 | 26 May 1814 | Formed through the expansion of the old Sappers and Miners Companies |
| 2nd Battalion of Sappers and Miners | 2° Battaglione Zappatori e Minatori | 2 April 1814 | 26 May 1814 | |
| Sappers and Miners Companies (6 coys) | Compagnia Minatori e Zappatori | 25 July 1806 | 21 April 1809 | Expanded and grouped together to form the 1st Battalion of Sappers and Miners |
| 7th Company of Sappers | 7° Compagnia Zappatori | 25 December 1810 | 1814 | Formed for service in Corfu, French Ionian Islands |

=== Internal Security Guard ===
| English name | Italian Name | Formation Date | Disbanded |
|---|---|---|---|
| Civic Guard of Naples | Guardia Civica di Napoli | 15 July 1806 | 8 November 1808 |
| Selected Volunteers of the City of Naples | Volontari Scelti della Città di Napoli | 16 June 1809 | 31 July 1809 |
| Home Security Guard | Guardia d'Interna Sicurezza | 18 March 1813 | May 1815 |
