= Jean-Louis Brousse-Desfaucherets =

French playwright and administrator

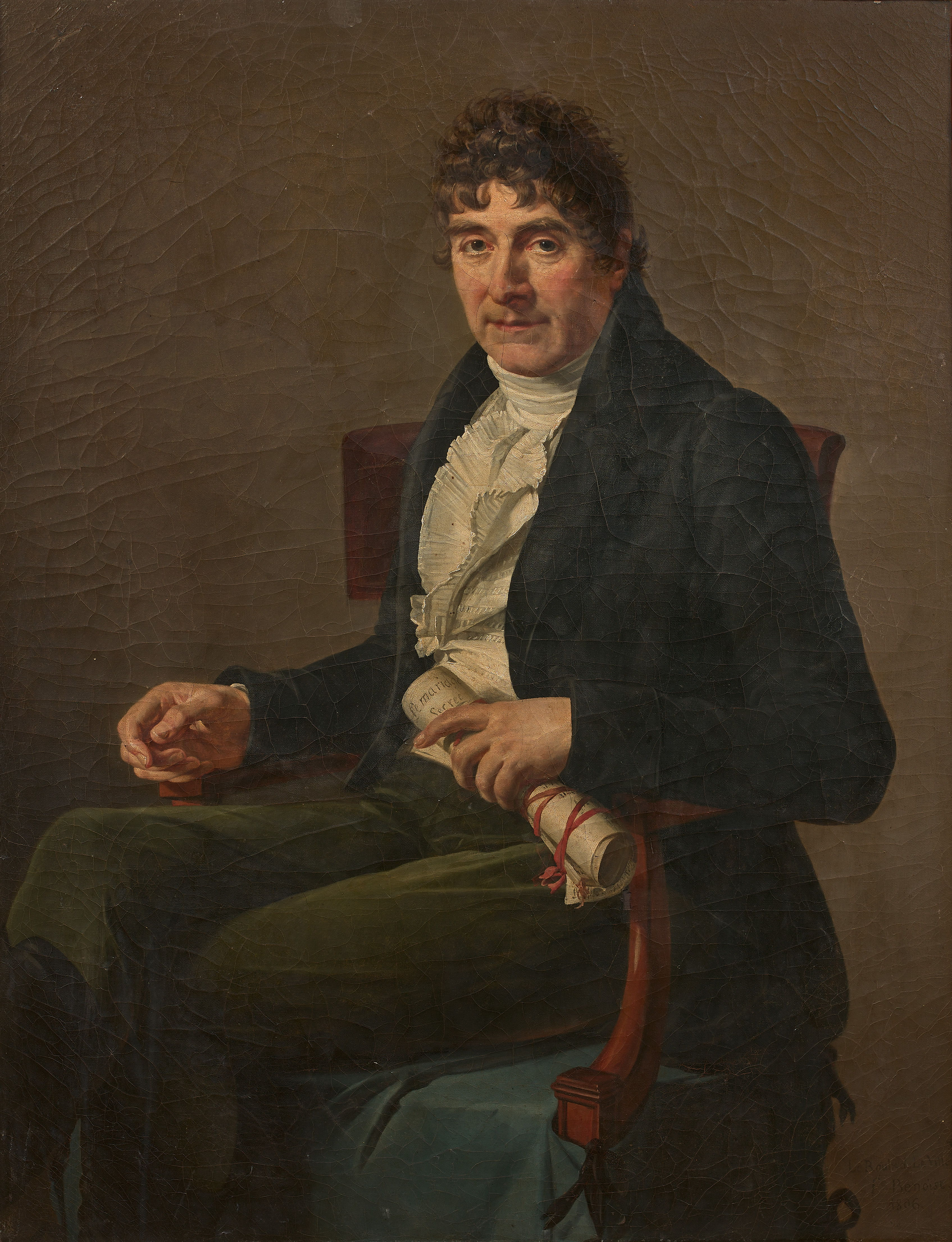
Portrait of Jean-Louis Brousse-Desfaucherets by Marie-Guillemine Benoist, 1806

Jean-Louis Brousse-Desfaucherets (1742, in Paris – 18 February 1808, in Paris), was a French playwright and administrator.

== Biography ==
The son of a wealthy attorney at the Parlement of Paris, he led the life of a man of the world until the French Revolution. Desfaucherets authored several plays presented in different Parisian theaters including l’Avare cru bienfaisant, a comedy in five acts and verse, given in the Théâtre-Français December 15, 1784.Le Mariage secret, comedy in three acts and verse, was presented at the château de Fontainebleau, Friday 4 November 1783, and for the first time in Paris by ordinary comedians of the king, Friday, March 10, 1786. Printed in 1786 (Paris, veuve Duchesne, 1786, in-8°. — New. edit. Paris, Barba, 1818, in-8°.), it is considered the best play of the author, with a total of forty performances. It is asserted that the Count of Provence, had the largest share in this play. Le Mariage secret having first been refused, the Count of Provence heard that and wrote the same day to the gentleman responsible for the management of the Théâtre Français that he wanted the play be received: it was then, "on order", making the studied and successfully performed.

In the same year, Desfaucherets gave the Portrait, ou le danger de tout dire, comedy in one act and in verse, as well as la Double clef, ou Colombine mannequin, parade in two acts and in verse, mingled with ariettes, which was presented at the Comédie Italienne.

In 1789, he gave public speeches that were noticed. He was successively appointed an alternate member of the Third Estate of the generality of Paris and lieutenant of mayor in public institutions. In 1790 he published as such a Compte rendu concernant l’administration de Paris. In 1791 he was elected a member of the board of the Seine, and expelled from the position under the Reign of Terror for his moderate views, he was imprisoned for a time as a suspect. He reappeared in public life in 1800 only, when Nicolas Frochot, the prefect of the Seine, appointed him head of the office of the civil hospitals of Paris. In 1804, he became a member of the board of censorship, where he was responsible until his death of theatrical censorship.

In March 1798, he presented les Dangers de la présomption, comedy in five acts and in verse; in 1799, l’Astronome, comedy in two acts and in prose, mingled with ariettes, music by Lebrun, and la Punition, one-act opera, music by Cherubini; in 1800, Arioste gouverneur, ou le Triomphe du génie, in collaboration with Jean-François Roger, and presented at the théâtre du Vaudeville.

== Works ==
Theatre

- 1774: Le Bon Père, ou la Bonne Aventure, three-act comedy, in prose, Cernay, 11 November
- 1784: L'Avare cru bienfaisant, five-act comedy, in verse, Paris, Théâtre de l'Odéon, 15 December
- 1785: Le Mariage secret, three-act comedy, in verse, Château de Fontainebleau, 4 November; Paris, Théâtre-Français, 10 March 1786
- 1786: La Double Clef, ou Colombine commissaire, two-act comedy, in verse, mingled with ariettes, Paris, Théâtre Italien, 25 June
- 1786: Le Portrait, ou le Danger de tout dire, one-act comedy, in verse, Paris, Théâtre de l'Odéon, 13 May
- 1798: L'Astronome, opéra comique, with Louis-Sébastien Lebrun, Paris, Théâtre Feydeau, 21 November
- 1799: La Punition, one-act opéra comique, music by Luigi Cherubini, Paris, Théâtre Feydeau, 23 February
- 1800: Arioste gouverneur, ou le Triomphe du génie, one-act comedy, with François Roger, Paris, Théâtre du Vaudeville, 15 March
- 1800: Le Portrait de Fielding, one-act comedy, mingled with vaudevilles, with Jean-Baptiste-Denis Després and Alexandre-Joseph-Pierre de Ségur, Paris, Théâtre du Vaudeville, 23 April
- 1801: La Pièce en répétition, two-act comedy, in prose, with François Roger, Paris, Théâtre Louvois, 1801

Official pieces

- 1790: Compte rendu à l'assemblée générale des représentants de la commune de Paris, le 8 février 1790, par M. Brousse Desfaucherets, lieutenant de maire au département des établissements publics Text online
- 1792: Discours sur les monuments publics, prononcé au conseil du département de Paris, le 15 décembre 1791 Text online
- 179?)Réponse du département des établissements publics, au mémoire présenté par le département de la police, à la commune & aux soixante districts, au sujet des spectacles Text online

== Sources ==
- Antoine-Vincent Arnault, Biographie nouvelle des contemporains, vol. III, 1821, (p. 524-5).
- Chaudon, Louis-Mayeul (1810). Dictionnaire universel, historique, critique et bibliographique (in French). Vol. 3. Mame. pp. 331–2..
