= Marcq =

Marcq may refer to:

== Places ==
=== Belgium ===
- Mark (Dender), a river tributary of the Dender
- Marcq, Wallonia, a village and former municipality in Enghien, Belgium

=== France ===
- Marcq, Ardennes
- Marcq, Yvelines
- Marcq-en-Barœul, Nord
- Marcq-en-Ostrevent, Nord

== People with the surname ==
- Damien Marcq (born 1988), French footballer
