= Claude Fournier (revolutionary) =

French personality of the Revolution

Claude Fournier L'Héritier (French pronunciation: [klod fuʁnje leʁitje]; 21 December 1745 – 1825) was a French personality of the Revolution, nicknamed l'Américain ("the American").

== Life ==
=== Early activities ===
He was born at Auzon (Haute-Loire), the son of a poor weaver, and went to the French West Indies to seek his fortune. On the island of Saint-Domingue (Haiti), he began the manufacture of tafia (an inferior quality of rum), but lost everything in a fire.

=== Revolution ===
Returning to France, he joined the Revolution with enthusiasm, and distinguished himself by organizing a popular armed force which became involved in all major insurrections of the capital including the Women's March on Versailles (1789), Champ de Mars Massacre (1791), the storming of the Tuileries Palace (1792) and the 9 September massacres.

He was on bad terms with the majority of the politicians (particularly with Jean-Paul Marat) and spent much of his time in prison, all governments regarding him as an agitator and accusing him of inciting to insurrection. Arrested for the first time for trying to force an entrance into the club of the Cordeliers, from which he had been expelled, he was released, but was in prison from 12 December 1793, to 21 September 1794, and again from 9 March to 26 October 1795.

=== Consulate, Empire, Restoration ===
After the attempt on the First Consul in the Rue Sainte-Nicaise he was deported to French Guiana, but was allowed to return to the French Empire in 1809. In 1811, while under surveillance at Auxerre, he was accused of having provoked a riot against indirect taxes known as the droits réunis (afterwards called contributions indirectes), and was imprisoned in the Château d'If, where he remained until 1814.

On the second Bourbon Restoration, Fournier was confined for about nine months in La Force Prison. After 1816 he turned Royalist, and passed his last years in importuning the Restoration government for compensation for his lost property in Saint-Domingue. He died in obscurity.

== See also ==
Society of the Friends of Truth
