= Jean-François Roger =

French politician, journalist, poet and dramatic author (1776–1842)

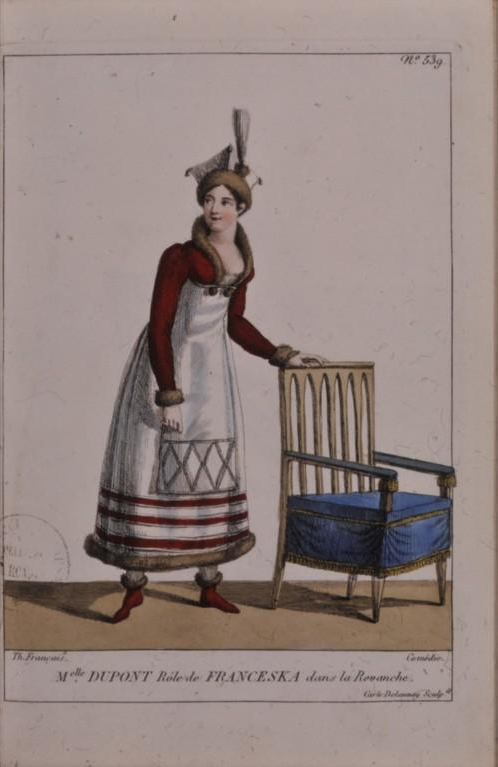
- La revanche - comedy by François Roger and Auguste Creuzé de Lesser
- Born: 17 April 1776; Langres, France
- Died: 1 March 1842 (aged 65); Paris, France
- Occupations: Politician, journalist, playwright

Jean-François, chevalier Roger, sometimes called François Roger (17 April 1776, Langres – 1 March 1842), was a French politician, journalist, poet and dramatic author. During the Revolution, at 16 years of age, he and his family were imprisoned for seventeen months for singing royalist songs. He was a civil servant, and he entered l' University where he published works of school literature. He was later appointed Professor during the Empire and Restoration.

He was elected member of the French Academy, as a replacement for Suard, on 8 August 1817 and received by the duke of Lévis on 30 November next. His election was widely criticized. He was a member of the Commission of the Dictionary where he fought the Lacretelle proposal, accepted Villemain and the count of Holy-Aulaire and voted against Victor Hugo. He was one of the companions of the “Lunch of the Fork”.

Of his comic and lyric works, sometimes written in collaboration with Etienne de Jouy, his greatest success is a comedy in verse, in three acts: L'Avocat, played for the first time at the Comédie-Française.

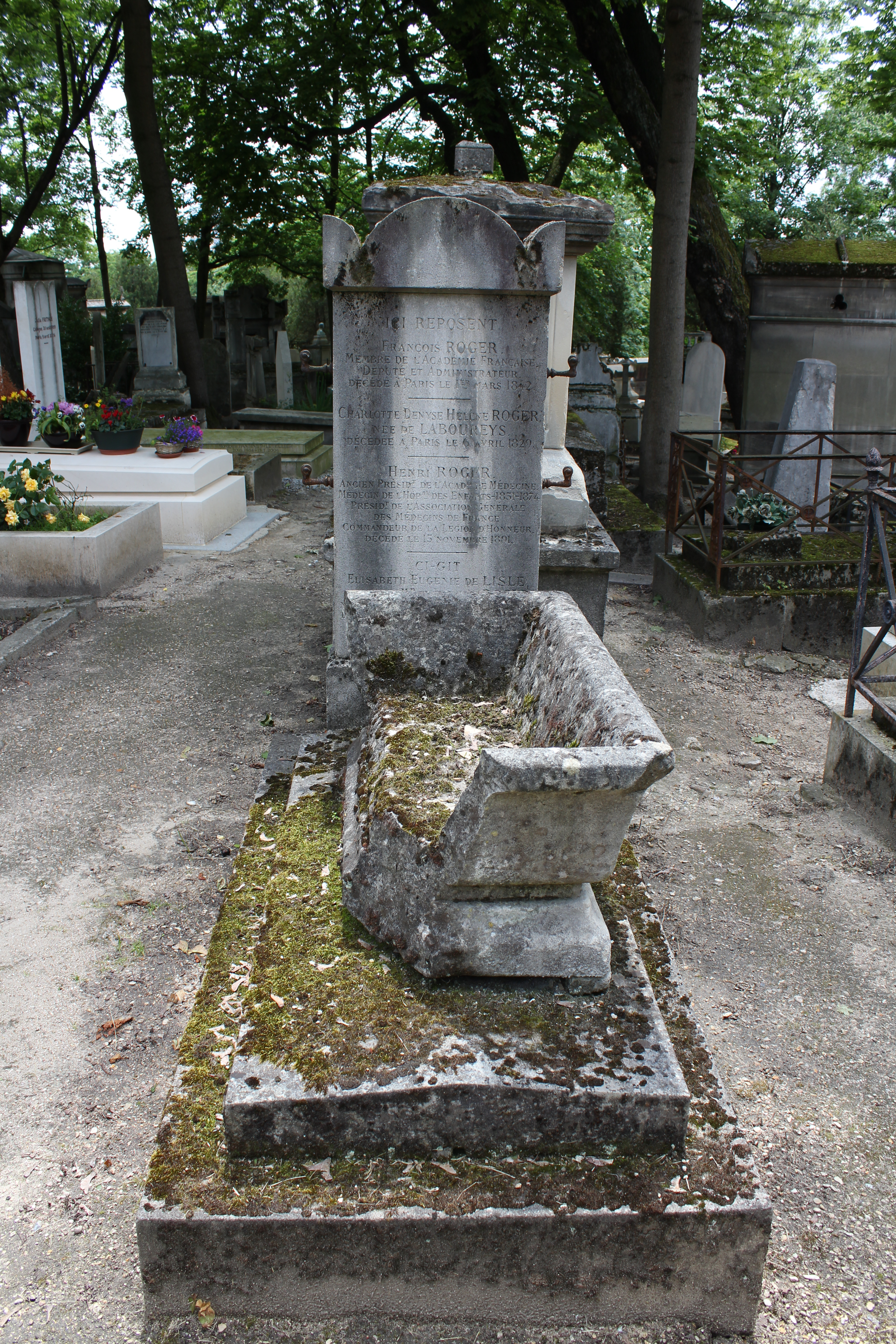
Roger's grave at Père Lachaise cemetery (21st division

== Works ==
=== Theatre ===
- La Dupe de soi-même, comédie en 3 actes et en vers, Paris, les Comédiens français, 22 germinal an VII (1798).
- Le Valet de deux maîtres, opéra-comique en 1 acte en prose, Paris, Théâtre de la rue Feydeau, 12 brumaire an VIII (1799).
- L'Épreuve délicate, comédie en 1 acte, en vers, Paris, les Comédiens français, 24 nivôse an VI (1798).
- Arioste gouverneur, ou le Triomphe du génie, one-act comedy, mingled with vaudevilles, with Jean-Louis Brousse-Desfaucherets, Paris, Vaudeville, 24 ventôse an VIII (1799).
- L'Avocat, comédie en 3 actes, en vers, Paris, Théâtre-Français, 12 March 1806.
- La Revanche, comédie en 3 actes et en prose, Paris, Théâtre-Français, 15 July 1809.
- Caroline, ou le Tableau, comédie en 1 acte, en vers, Paris, les Comédiens français, 12 vendémiaire an IX (1810).
- Le Billet de loterie : comédie en 1 acte, mêlée d'ariettes, Paris, Opéra-Comique, 14 September 1811.
- Le Nouveau seigneur du village, opéra-comique en 1 acte, Paris, Opéra-Comique, 29 June 1813.
- L'Amant et le mari, opéra comique en 2 actes, Paris, Opéra-Comique, 8 June 1820.
- Marie Stuart en Écosse, ou le Château de Douglas, drame lyrique en 3 actes et en prose, Paris, Opéra-Comique, 30 August 1823.

=== Other ===
- Théâtre classique, ou Esther, Athalie, Polyeucte and le Misanthrope commentés; ouvrage prescrit et adopté par la commission des livres classiques pour l'enseignement des lycées et des écoles secondaires, 1807
- Vie privée, politique et militaire du Prince Henri de Prusse, frère de Frédéric II, 1809
- Cours de poésie sacrée, par le docteur Lowth, traduit pour la première fois du latin en français par F. Roger, 1813
- Œuvres diverses de M. Roger, publiées par M. Charles Nodier, 1835
