= Louis de Frotté =

French soldier (1766–1800)

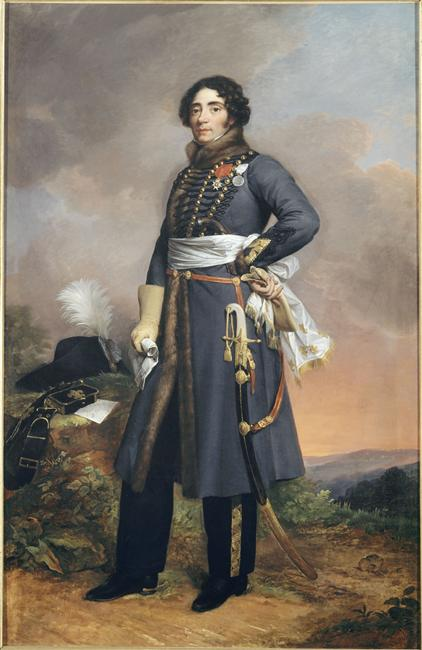
- Portrait by Louise de Bouteiller, 1822
- Born: 1 August 1766; Alençon, Normandy, Kingdom of France
- Died: 18 February 1800 (aged 33) Verneuil-sur-Avre, Normandy, French Republic
- Allegiance: Kingdom of France; Émigrés; Chouan rebels
- Branch: (Kingdom of France) French Army
- Service years: 1781–1800
- Conflicts: French Revolutionary Wars

Marie Pierre Louis de Frotté (August 1, 1766 – February 18, 1800) was a French soldier and an opponent of the Republic during the Revolutionary Wars.

Louis de Frotté was born in Alençon (Normandy). He joined the Royal Army in 1781, and was in command of infantry units by 1789, when the French Revolution broke out. Frotté joined the émigrés, and served in the combined Prussian and Austrian army of the Duke of Brunswick, which aimed to restore the monarchy in France.

Frotté fought at Valmy in 1792, and, after Brunswick's unsuccessful campaign, sailed to England. There, he joined the vicomte de Bussy's regiment of émigrés, Les Chevaliers de la couronne, venturing into Brittany several times and linking up with Chouan royalists, who had risen up against the French Republic that had evolved from the Revolution.

Frotté soon became a leader of the Chouan revolt, organizing the rebels into military units and forming a staff. By 1796, however, forces under General Hoche had scored several victories, defeating the Chouans and forcing de Frotté to flee abroad, after repulsing his assault on Tinchebray. Returning to England, he was enlisted by Charles, Count of Artois (Louis XVI's younger brother), in an attempt to start yet another rebellion in his native Normandy.

This rebellion was fairly successful, but, after Napoleon Bonaparte seized power, the tide began to turn against Frotté, as most of his direct subordinates were killed. When, in early 1800, many rebel soldiers deserted, he began to negotiate with the government, eventually being invited by General Guidal to a meeting in Alençon.

Frotté met with Guidal at the Hôtel du Cygne on 15 February 1800. During the meeting, he was arrested by Republican forces and, three days later, brought before a military tribunal, which sentenced him to death by firing squad. He was executed on February 18.
