= Guards of Honour (Naples) =

Regiment of Honour Guards Regiment of Life Guards Company of Honour Guards
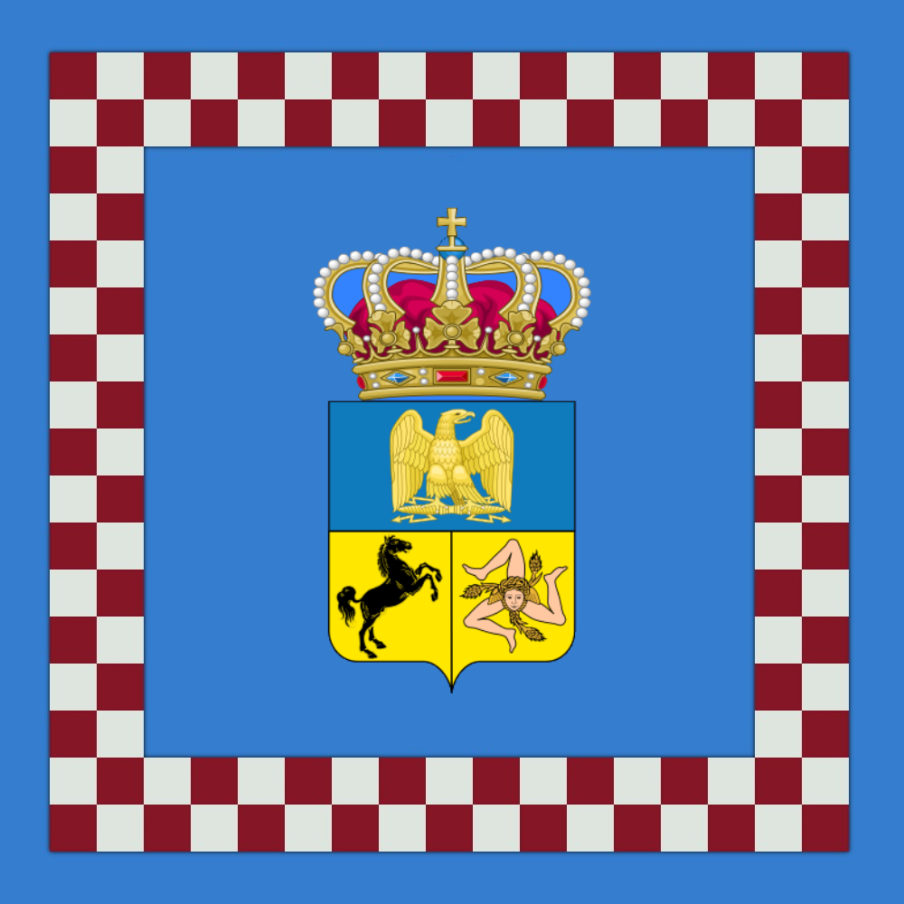
- Royal Banner of the Kingdom of Naples (post 1809, during Murat's reign)
- Active: 1806–1813; 1813–1815
- Country: Kingdom of Naples
- Branch: Royal Army of Naples
- Type: Royal Bodyguards
- Role: Providing protection for the Royal Family
- Size: Regiment (1806–1814); Company (1814–1815)
- Part of: Royal Neapolitan Guard
- Depot: Naples, Campania
- Engagements: Napoleonic Wars; French Invasion of Russia; Neapolitan War

The Neapolitan Regiment of Honour Guards (Neapolitan: Reggimento della Guardia d'Onore) was a royal bodyguard unit of the Royal Neapolitan Guard, and was in turn part of the wider Neapolitan Army. The regiment was formed following the succession of Joachim Murat, and would continue to act as the official bodyguard under different designations until its eventual disbandment in 1815 following the disastrous Neapolitan War.

== Guards of Honour ==
=== Formation ===
The Regiment of Honour Guards (Reggimento della Guardia d'Onore) was formed as part of the expansion of the Royal Neapolitan Army under the new King of Naples Joseph Bonaparte, who sought to form a regiment of mounted horse to serve as his personal bodyguards. When the new King Joachim Murat took his place as King of Naples, he brought along his former personal bodyguards, the Light Horse Lancers Regiment of Berg, which in turn helped provide one squadron (two companies) of the new unit, which had only existed on paper at this point. A royal decree of 5 August 1809 created the regiment, which was organised into fourteen 'provincial companies', each named after a region.

The new regiment's uniform was as follows: Short tailed single breasted coat of scarlet cloth closed down by nine white metal buttons. Pale yellow collar with a white buttonhole lace. White fringed epaulettes with white shoulder cord on right shoulder. On front of collar, yellow piping and nine white tasselled buttonhole laces. Yellow pointed cuffs with bearing a white vertical tasselled buttonhole lace. Yellow turnbacks. Dark azure blue overalls with two broad yellow side bands. Polish czapka in pale yellow cloth piped scarlet with black leather crown bearing a sun plate with brass centre stamped with royal cipher and silver rays. Green plume with yellow tip. Black leather peak with white metal strengthening and white metal chin scales. Ochre leatherwork trimmed white. Black leather cartridge pouch trimmed with brass and decorated with a brass royal cipher plate. Ochre hussar style sword belt trimmed white with S-shaped buckle. Light cavalry curved bladed sabre with brass three bars hilt and iron scabbard. White sword knot. Hungarian saddle covered with light crimson cloth shabraque laced white embroidered with white royal cipher in rear corners. Round portmanteau of blue cloth with white laces.

Trumpeters uniforms consisted of the other ranks' dress in reversed colours, yellow faced scarlet with collar and cuffs trimmed by a livery lace, white and light crimson chequered.

=== Task & Recruitment ===
The new regiment was established as a personal guard unit entrusted with the task of serving and protecting the sovereign. The unit was composed of young people between the ages of 18 and 30, with suitable physique and attitude, coming from families of nobles or the bourgeoisie with an annual income of at least 400 ducats, including the maintenance of their horse. It became commonplace to draw up the registration lists for each province and to access the suitability of candidates.

The idea of joining the army as a whole throughout Southern Italy was not welcomed with enthusiasm, so requests were made to each municipality by the General Secretary of the Land to find names of several allistati (those available for military service), most answers of which were in the negative. First of all, economic impediments were presented which also led those initially recruited to ask for exemptions or to transfer to other units. Many young people suited to the task were, in the second half, exempt from having made payments into the regiment's coffers.

=== Invasion of Russia ===
Furthermore, on 16 November 1810, a royal decree sanctioned severe repression on those trying to desert or those who had Bourbonic sympathies. This decree effected the Guards, where emigration rates exploded as many escaped to the Kingdom of Sicily. Despite the recruiting and repression, the Honour Guards were sent to Prussia, and later Mecklenburg, the regiment reached full strength before the Neapolitan Division moved into the Grand Duchy of Warsaw to join the XI Corps of the Grande Armée. Here, the regiment formed part of the 3rd Brigade, 33rd Infantry Division, in which the regiment provided three squadrons, of some 31 officers and 391 soldiers, commanded by Colonel Sambiase, and grouped with the Vélites à Cheval of the Guard and a Horse Artillery Battery under Brigade General Jean Baptiste, Baron de Fracheschi's 3rd Brigade.

Though they had the honour of being at the front of the invasion, the Neapolitans didn't make it very far before being halted from extreme desertion and terrible supply. The entire division melted away without seeing any action. The Horse Guards however, were different. They were able to hold their own and formed part of the Emperor's escort during his rush back to Paris. However, once again, because of poor supplies, the regiment lost all their horses long before the Emperor reached the Rhine. Following the failure of the campaign, the regiment returned to Naples, having never seen full combat.

== Life Guards ==
On 10 March 1813, the regiment was redesignated as the Regiment of Life Guards (Neapolitan: Reggimento 'e Guardia Cuórpa), reduced to the size of two squadrons (four companies), and the uniform adjusted to complement the new name. The new uniform was now as follows: Long tailed single breasted coat of scarlet cloth closed down by nine white metal buttons. Pale yellow collar with a silver buttonhole lace. White trefoil epaulettes with white shoulder cord on right shoulder. On front of coat, yellow piping and nine white tasselled buttonhole laces. Yellow rounded cuffs bearing two white horizontal tasselled buttonhole laces. Yellow turnbacks decorated with silver grenade patches. White breeches and black high cuffed boots. Black felt cocked hat with white lace and strengthening. White plume over Neapolitan cockade with white strap. Ochre leatherwork trimmed white. White cartridge pouch trimmed with brass bearing a brass royal cipher plate. Pouch belt covered with blue or yellow (following company) velvet trimmed with white lace. Ochre sword belt trimmed white with brass plate buckle stamped with royal cypher. Heavy cavalry straight bladed sabre with brass battle hilt and iron scabbard with brass fittings. White sword knot with blue or yellow tassel. French saddle covered with dark azure blue cloth schabraque with white laces and scarlet outer piping embroidered with white royal cipher in rear corners. Square portmanteau of blue cloth with white laces and scarlet piping. Trumpeters uniforms consisted of the other ranks' dress in reversed colours, yellow faced scarlet with collar and cuffs trimmed by a livery lace, white and light crimson chequered.

== Last Years ==
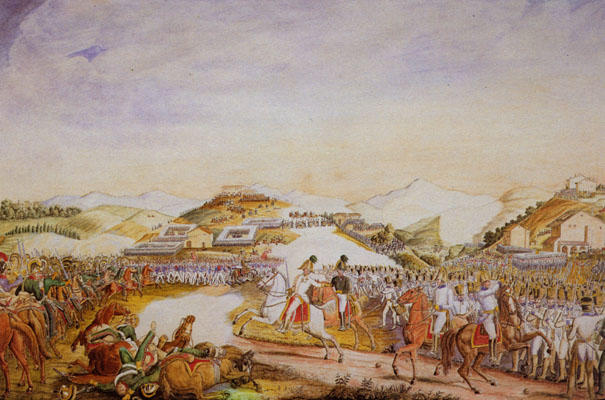
Battle of Tolentino, the decisive battle which lead to the complete collapse of the Neapolitan Field Army under King Murat. Though not the last action, it marked the official end to the young kingdom's army.

Following the failure of the regiment in Eastern Europe, it was returned to Naples and resumed its ceremonial duties. A year later, on 1 October 1814, following cuts after the Treaty of Fontainebleau and subsequent end to the Napoleonic Wars, the regiment went through yet another reorganisation. Following a royal decree of 28 July 1814, the regiment was redesignated as the Regiment of Honour Guards and granted all previous honours and uniforms, etc. The regiment was doubled in strength, with four squadrons (of two companies each, totalling 8 companies). However, almost immediately this was reverted and the new unit raised at the strength of just one company. At this point, the name was altered, causing the unit being known hitherto as the Company of Honour Guards (Compagnia delle Guardie d'Onore). The other three squadrons were transferred to the Guard Lancers Regiment on 1 October 1814.

Napoleon's return to France in early 1815 caused yet another conflict, though Murat failed to come to the assistance of his old leader. However, at the beginning of June 1815, just as Napoleon was about to start his 1815 campaign in Belgium, Murat launched his invasion into Northern Italy in the Neapolitan War. After initial successes, Murat's field army was defeated at the Battle of Tolentino, and the remainder of troops deserted en masse. Shortly after, the Austria Army of Naples under General Frederick Bianchi, Duke of Casalanza defeated the Field Army of the Kingdom of Naples at the Battle of Tolentino, sealing the fate of the junior King and his Kingdom, with the unit quickly following suite.

== Footnotes ==
Notes

Citations
