= Benjamin Nicolas Marie Appert =

Feench philanthropist

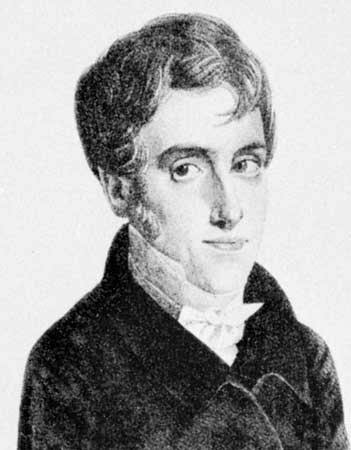
Benjamin Nicolas Marie Appert

Benjamin Nicolas Marie Appert (10 September 1797 – 1847) was a French philanthropist.

== Life ==
Appert was born in Paris. As a young man he introduced a system of mutual instruction into the regimental schools of the département of the Nord. Its success encouraged him to publish a Manual setting forth his system. While engaged in teaching prisoners at Montaigu jail, he fell under suspicion of having connived at the escape of two of them, and was thrown into the prison of La Force.

On his release, he resolved to devote the rest of his life to bettering the condition of those whose lot he had for a time shared, and he travelled much over Europe to study the various systems of prison discipline, and wrote several books on the subject. After the revolution of 1830, he became secretary to Queen Marie Amélie Therese and organized the measures taken for the relief of the needy. He was decorated with the Legion of Honour in 1833.
