= Marcq, Ardennes =

Marcq
- Commune
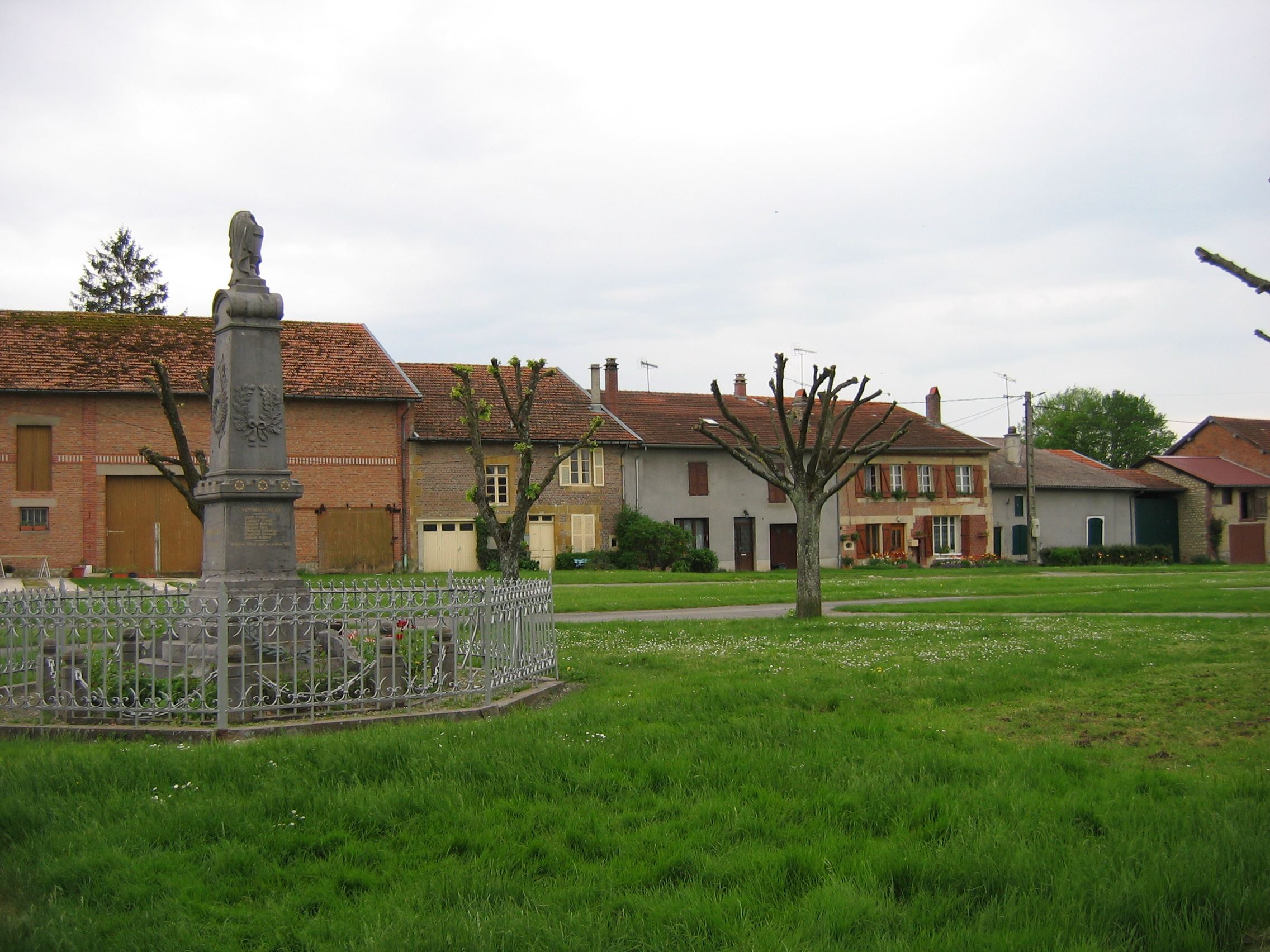
- The war memorial in Marcq
- Location of Marcq
- Location within France Location within Grand Est
- Coordinates: 49°19′12″N 4°55′26″E
- Country: France
- Region: Grand Est
- Department: Ardennes
- Arrondissement: Vouziers
- Canton: Attigny
- Intercommunality: Argonne Ardennaise

Government
  - Mayor (2020–2026): Séverine Lallement
- Area^{1}: 10.61 km^{2} (4.10 sq mi)
- Elevation: 155 m (509 ft)
- Highest elevation: 242 m (794 ft)
- Lowest elevation: 117 m (384 ft)
- Population (2023): 87
  - Density: 8.2/km^{2} (21/sq mi)
- Time zone: UTC+01:00 (CET)
  - Summer (DST): UTC+02:00 (CEST)
- INSEE/Postal code: 08274 /08250
- ^{1} French Land Register data, which excludes lakes, ponds, glaciers > 1 km^{2} (0.386 sq mi or 247 acres) and river estuaries.

Marcq (French pronunciation: [maʁk]) is a commune in the Ardennes department in northern France.

== Population ==
Historical population
Year	Pop.	±% p.a.
1968	201	—
1975	152	−3.91%
1982	119	−3.44%
1990	116	−0.32%
1999	103	−1.31%
2007	112	+1.05%
2012	103	−1.66%
2017	100	−0.59%
2023	87	−2.29%
Source: INSEE

== Notable people ==
- Anne Jean Marie René Savary, 1st Duke of Rovigo (1774–1833) a French military officer and diplomat who served in the French Revolutionary Wars, the Napoleonic Wars and the French invasion of Algeria.

== See also ==
- Communes of the Ardennes department
