= Anne Jean Marie René Savary =

French soldier and diplomat (1774–1833)

Anne Jean Marie René Savary Duke of Rovigo
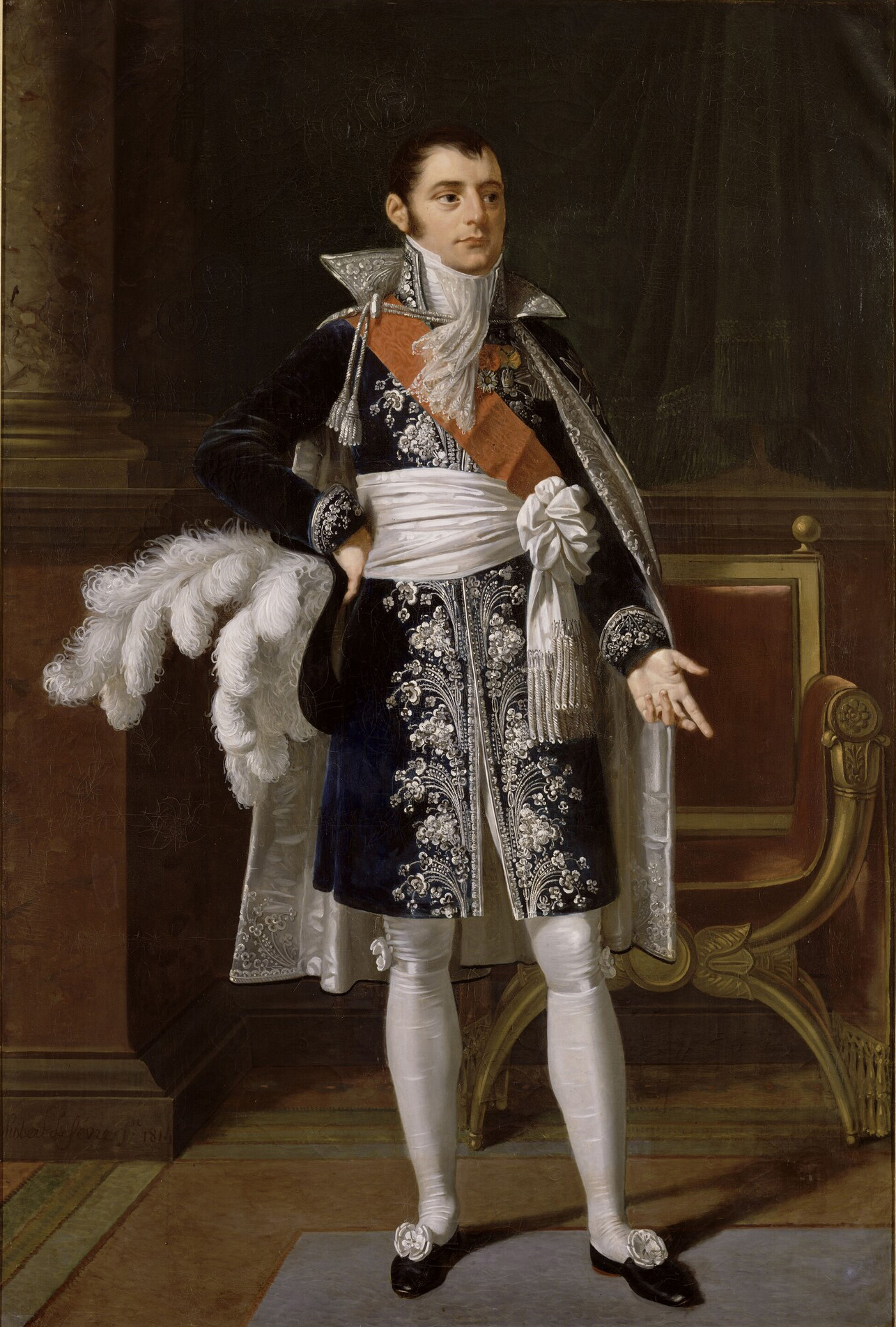
- Portrait by Robert Lefèvre, 1814
- Born: 26 April 1774; Marcq, Kingdom of France
- Died: 2 June 1833 (aged 59); Paris, Kingdom of France
- Military career
- Allegiance: France
- Service years: 1790–1833
- Rank: General of division
- Commands: Elite Gendarmes of the Imperial Guard
- Conflicts: French Revolutionary Wars; War of the Second Coalition; French campaign in Egypt and Syria; Battle of Marengo; Napoleonic Wars; War of the Fourth Coalition; Battle of Ostrołęka (1807); French conquest of Algeria

Anne Jean Marie René Savary, 1st duc de Rovigo (English: /sɑːvɑːˈri/ sa-va-REE, French: [an ʒɑ̃ maʁi ʁəne savaʁi]; 26 April 1774 – 2 June 1833) was a French military officer and diplomat who served in the French Revolutionary Wars, the Napoleonic Wars and the French invasion of Algeria. He was Minister of Police between 1810 and 1814.

== Early life and career ==
Savary was born in Marcq, Ardennes. He was educated at the college of St Louis in Metz and joined the royal army in 1790. His first military campaign was in 1792, under General Custine, against the retreating forces led by the Duke of Brunswick. He subsequently served under Pichegru and Moreau and distinguished himself during Moreau's strategic retreat from Swabia. In 1797, he was appointed chef d'escadron and participated in the Egyptian campaign under General Louis Desaix. He published an account of this campaign in his memoirs.

Savary fought in the Battle of Marengo on 14 June 1800, where he served alongside Desaix. Following Desaix's death in battle, Savary caught the attention of the First Consul Napoleon Bonaparte, and he was appointed commander of the Elite Gendarmes of the Consular Guard. Savary played a role in uncovering the details of the Georges Cadoudal–Pichegru conspiracy in 1804. He ventured to the cliffs of Biville in Normandy, a landing spot for the conspirators, and attempted to lure the Comte d'Artois (later known as Charles X) to land by mimicking signals used by the royalist plotters. However, his efforts were unsuccessful.

During his tenure as commanding officer at Vincennes, Savary became embroiled in controversy due to the summary execution of the Duc d'Enghien. Hulin, the presiding officer at the court-martial, later accused Savary of obstructing his attempts to appeal for mercy to Bonaparte. According to Hulin, Savary intervened when Hulin was drafting the appeal. Although Savary denied these allegations, his denial has not been widely accepted by historians.

== Napoleonic Wars ==
In February 1805, Savary was promoted to general of division. Shortly before the Battle of Austerlitz on 2 December 1805, Napoleon dispatched him with a message to emperor Alexander I, requesting an armistice. This maneuver only motivated the Russian monarch to strike a decisive blow, leading to disaster for the Russians. After the battle, Savary once again conveyed a message to Alexander, persuading him to negotiate a truce.

During the 1806 campaign, Savary boldly pursued the Prussians after the Battle of Jena. He also negotiated during the Siege of Hameln. At the beginning of the following year, he assumed command of a corps and achieved a victory at Ostrolenka on 16 February 1807.

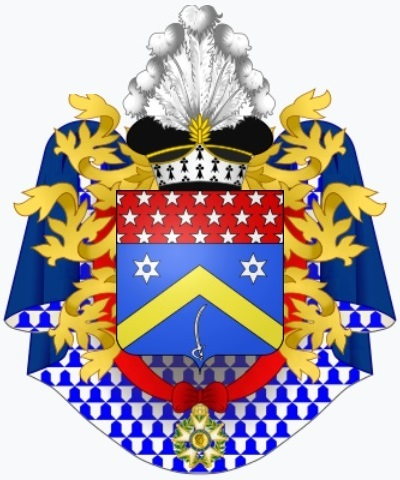
Heraldic achievement of Anne-Jean-Marie-René Savary, duc de Rovigo

After the Treaty of Tilsit was signed on 7 July 1807, Savary traveled to St. Petersburg as the French ambassador. He was soon replaced by General Caulaincourt, another individual involved in the execution of the duc d'Enghien. It is said that the empress dowager's aversion to Savary played a role in his recall. It is thought more likely that Napoleon required his scheming abilities for his Spanish campaign towards the end of 1807. Honoured with the title of Duke of Rovigo (duc de Rovigo), named after a small town in Venetia, Savary departed for Madrid when Napoleon's plans for exerting control over Spain were nearing completion. Working alongside Murat, Savary exploited the divisions within the Spanish royal family in March and April 1808. He convinced Charles IV of Spain, who had recently surrendered under duress, and his son Ferdinand VII, the de facto king of Spain, to submit their claims to Napoleon. Savary persuaded Ferdinand to cross the Pyrenees and proceed to Bayonne, a decision that cost Ferdinand his crown and his freedom until 1814.

In September 1808, Savary accompanied the emperor to the meeting at the Congress of Erfurt with Alexander I, and in 1809 he participated in the campaign against Austria.

Following Fouché's disgrace in the spring of 1810, Savary became Minister of Police. He transformed the office into an inquisition, in contrast to the leniency under the Jacobin Fouché. Notable incidents during his tenure included carrying out Napoleon's order to exile Madame de Staël and destroy her work De l'Allemagne. However, Savary's vigilance failed him during the peculiar conspiracy of General Malet. Two of Malet's accomplices apprehended Savary in his sleep, briefly imprisoning him for a few hours on 23 October 1812. This event brought ridicule upon Savary, tarnishing his reputation. As a token of appreciation, Napoleon granted him duché grand-fief of Rovigo within his Kingdom of Italy, a rare hereditary honor, which ceased to exist in 1872.

== Hundred days, imprisonment, in exile and a final command in Algeria ==
Savary was among the last to desert Napoleon following his abdication on 11 April 1814, and among the first to welcome his return from Elba in 1815 during the hundred days. During this period, Savary was inspector-general of the gendarmerie and a peer of France. Following the Battle of Waterloo, he accompanied Napoleon to Rochefort and sailed with him to Plymouth aboard HMS Bellerophon. Savary was not allowed to accompany Napoleon to Saint Helena, but was interned for several months in Malta. After escaping, he traveled to Smyrna where he settled for a while, before eventually being allowed to return to France. Later, he settled in Rome.

In 1830, Savary came back into favour following the July Revolution, and in 1831, assumed command of the French army in Algeria. In Algiers, he antagonized French civil authorities with his authoritarian treatment of Arabs with disregard for Algerians’ religious beliefs. In spite of protests, the Ketchaoua Mosque was confiscated in December 1831 and consecrated as the cathedral of Saint Philippe on Christmas Day, 1832.

He was also responsible for the massacre of the local El Ouffia tribe alongside Maximilien Joseph Schauenburg and the deaths of several Arab leaders whom he lured into negotiations.

While he was not the first military governor of French possessions in Algeria he was the one who introduced extreme violence into the occupation and pacification of Algiers on a scale not seen before him.

== Personal life ==
Comtesse du Cayla was said to be a mistress of Savary and to have even born him a son.

His failing health meant that he returned to France, where he died in Paris in June 1833.

== See also ==
- Massacre of El Ouffia
- Maximilien Joseph Schauenburg

== Sources ==
- This work in turn cites:
  - Mémoires du duc de Rovigo (4 vols., London, 1828; English edition also in 4 vols., London, 1828); a French edition annotated by D. Lacroix (5 vols., Paris, 1900)
  - Extrait des mémoires de M. le duc de Rovigo concernant le catastrophe de M. le duc d'Enghien (London, 1823)
  - Le Duc de Rovigo jugée par lui-même et par ses contemporains, by L.F.E. (Paris, 1823)
  - A.F.N. Macquart, Refutation de l'écrit de M. le duc de Rovigo (1823).
