= Menin =

Menin may refer to:

- Menin, the French name for the Belgian town of Menen
- Menin, a little village in the municipality of Cesiomaggiore, Italy
- Menin or MEN1, a tumor suppressor associated with multiple endocrine neoplasia type 1
- Měnín, village and municipality in the Czech Republic
- Menin (title), office in Ancien Régime France
- Manin, Syria, old name of this Syrian village

== See also ==
- Menin Gate, a war memorial in Ypres, Belgium
- Menin Gate at Midnight, a 1927 painting by Australian artist Will Longstaff
