= Pierre-Augustin Hulin =

French general (1758–1841)

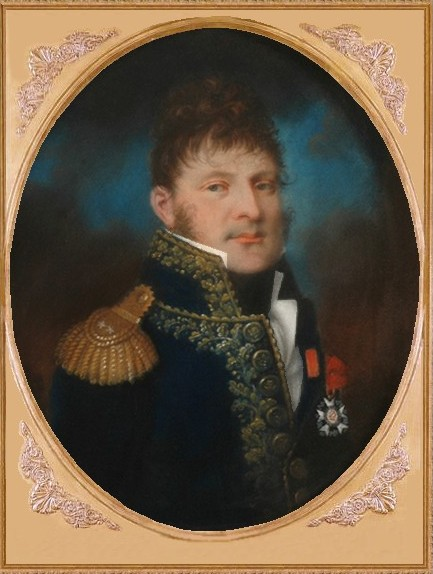
- portrait miniature of Hulin
- Born: 6 September 1758; Paris, France
- Died: 9 January 1841 (aged 82) Paris, France
- Allegiance: Kingdom of France; Kingdom of the French; French First Republic; First French Empire
- Service years: 1771-1815
- Rank: General de division
- Commands: Military governorship of Paris; 1st Division
- Conflicts: Siege of Genoa
- Awards: Legion of Honor

Pierre-Augustin Hulin (French pronunciation: [pjeʁ oɡystɛ̃ ylɛ̃]; 6 September 1758 – 9 January 1841) was a French general under Napoleon who took part in the storming of the Bastille, the trial of the Duke of Enghien, and the foiling of the Malet coup.

== Early life ==
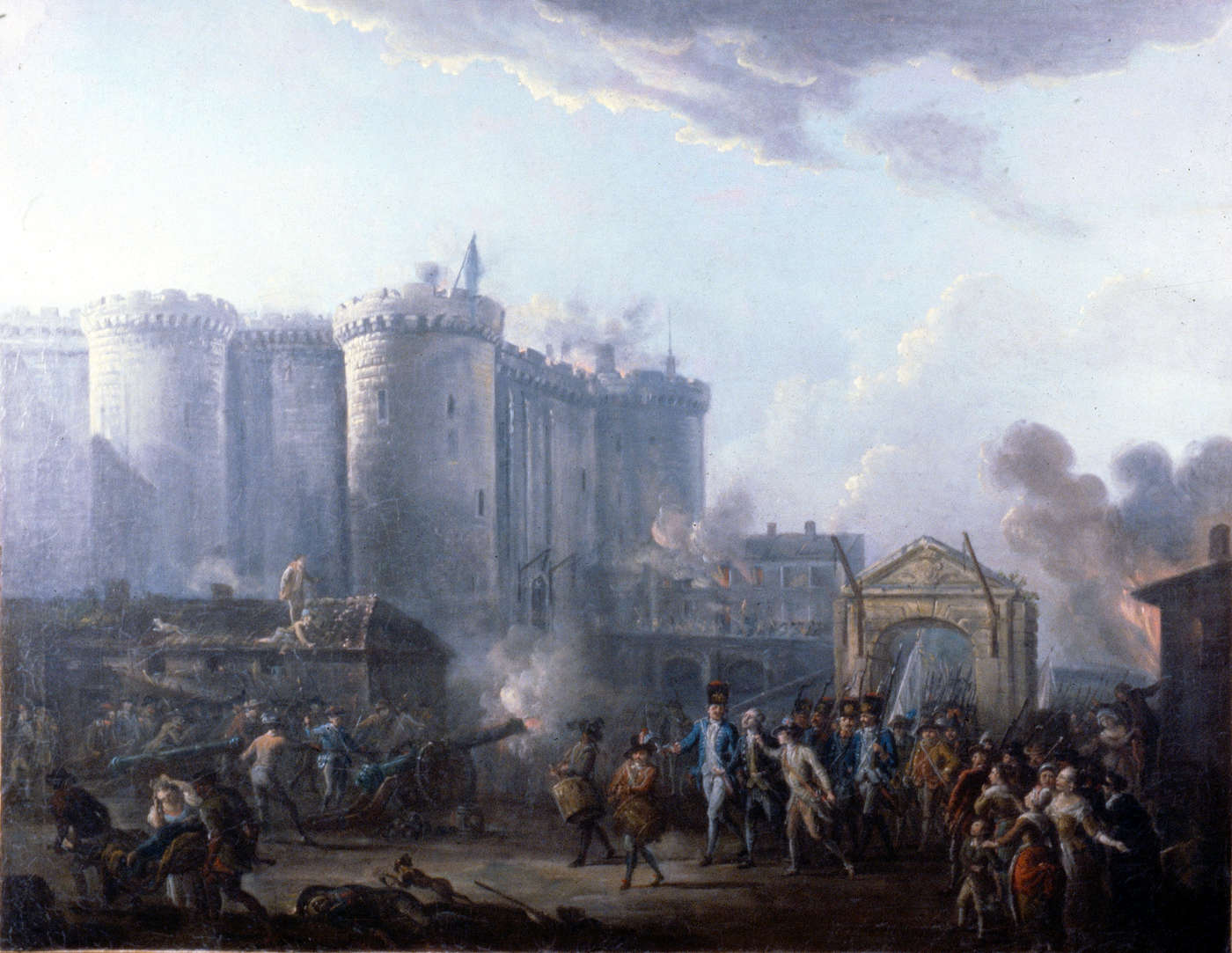
Oil painting by Jean Baptiste Lallemand depicting the arrest of the Marquis de Launay, the governor of the Bastille. Either the soldier or the grey-clad civilian next to Launay may be Hulin (Musée de la Révolution française).

Pierre Augustin Hulin, the son of a Parisian draper, was born on 6 September 1758. He entered the army in 1771, serving in a Champagne infantry regiment. In 1772 he was transferred to the French Guards, in the ranks of which he rose to sergeant. In 1787 he had already retired from the guards and was a successful operator of the Royal Laundry. During the week that preceded the storming of the Bastille Hulin was several times spotted agitating the mob against the Crown. Madame de Staël wrote that Hulin told her: "I want to take revenge for your father on these bastards who want to butcher us." Louis Abel Beffroy de Reigny recorded similar inflammatory speeches addressed to the royal soldiers, Louis-Guillome Pitra dramatized Hulin's speech into "The Parisians are slaughtered like lambs, and you are not marching with us?"

On the day of the storming of the Bastille Hulin offered his services to the Hôtel de Ville. He assembled a company of seventy men armed with five cannons. Around 3 o'clock he led his men from Les Invalides to the Bastille. Two hours later artillery fire and pressure from the Bastille personnel persuaded its governor Marquis de Launay to capitulate. By this time the attacking mob lost around a hundred men, the defenders of the Bastille had only one man killed. Hulin and his deputy Jacob Job Elie defended De Launay from the mob and sent him under an armed escort to the Hôtel de Ville. According to Pitra, Hulin and Elie saved De Launay from lynching at least once, when the mob attacked them near the church of St. Louis. The mob finally forced their way past the convoy on the Place de Grève, when it was near its destination. A cook named Denót or Desnot killed De Launay, royalist provost Jacques de Flesselles was killed too. Although five were lynched, most of the Bastille's defenders were escorted safely to the Hôtel de Ville. The governor's head was severed and carried around the city on a pike.

The next day, 15 July 1789, Hulin was appointed company commander of the Volontaires de la Bastille, an armed force paid by the city government which later evolved into the National Guard. This permanent core of the newly created Paris militia was recruited from certified veterans of the Bastille Day such as Hulin, plus former French Guards. Hulin's own performance made him a national hero, a "herculean victor", and a staple of patriotic leaflets and magazines issued since 1790. Republican historians of the 19th century amplified popular perception and downplayed the excesses of the mob and underscored Hulin's own moderation.

As aristocrats left the army in large numbers, new officers were promoted from the enlisted ranks. Hulin, however, did not escape the excesses of the Reign of Terror and was incarcerated for almost a year, 1793–1794. When Robespierre's radical government fell in 1794, Hulin was released. During the French Revolutionary Wars, Hulin served in the Army of Italy and fought against the Austrians in the defense of Genoa and commanded troops in Milan, eventually rising to the rank of colonel.

== Service under Napoleon ==
Hulin, under the command of self-appointed First Consul Napoleon Bonaparte, served as chief of staff in several divisions and was later given command of the grenadiers of the Consular Guard. In August 1803 Hulin was promoted to brigadier general. In 1804 he presided over the commission that tried Louis Antoine, Duke of Enghien. The Duke, a descendant of the Condé family, a cadet branch of the House of Bourbon, was convicted of treason and was executed by firing squad, an act that was met by horror and anger from other European nations.

Hulin fought in the Grande Armée in the campaigns of 1805 and 1806, fighting in present-day Germany. He was given command of troops in Berlin after the completion of the Prussian campaign. In 1807 he was promoted to major general and appointed governor of Paris. He held the latter title until 1814, and during the Hundred Days in 1815. In 1808 he was styled Count of the Empire, and in 1809 was made Grand Officer of the Legion of Honor.

Hulin was the military governor of Paris in 1812, when pro-Republican General Claude François de Malet launched a coup while Napoleon was pursuing a disastrous campaign in Russia. Troops loyal to Malet seized many Bonapartist officers in the city and tried to take control of the government. When Hulin attempted to arrest the rebel general, Malet shot him in the face. Hulin's resistance caused troops and military police to turn on Malet and take him into custody. Malet and other conspirators were executed, Hulin was rewarded with the command of the 1st Division.

When Napoleon abdicated, Hulin's command was taken away from him by the restored Bourbon monarchy. However, when the former emperor returned from exile in 1815, Hulin was given back his position as divisional commander, which was again stripped from him when Napoleon was defeated. Hulin was exiled by the Bourbons, but was allowed to return to France in 1819.

Hulin died in Paris on 9 January 1841.

== In popular culture ==
He served as the main inspiration for the female character Oscar François de Jarjayes in the manga The Rose of Versailles by Riyoko Ikeda.

== Sources ==
- Philip J. Haythornthwaite (2001). [Napoleon's Commanders (1) 1792-1809]. Osprey Publishing. ISBN 1-84176-055-2.
- Hans-Jürgen Lüsebrink, Rolf Reichardt (1997). The Bastille: a history of a symbol of despotism and freedom. Duke University Press. ISBN 0-8223-1894-6.
- Robert Warren (2000). Jacques-Louis David and Jean-Louis Prieur, revolutionary artists: the public, the populace, and images of the French Revolution. SUNY Press. ISBN 0-7914-4288-8.
