= Javron-les-Chapelles =

- Commune
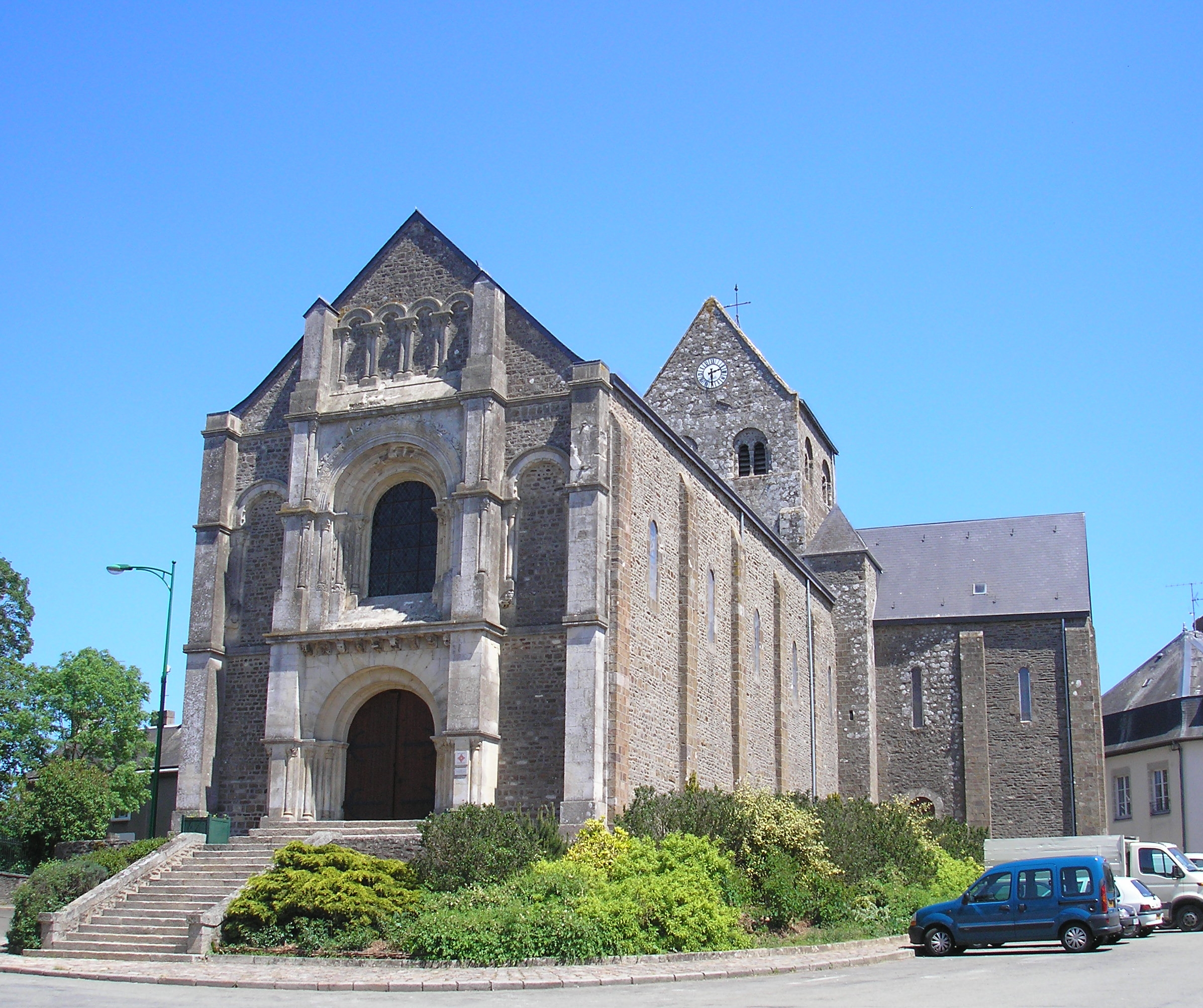
- The church of Saint-Jean-Baptiste, in Javron-les-Chapelles

- Coat of arms
- Location of Javron-les-Chapelles
- Location within France Location within Pays de la Loire
- Coordinates: 48°25′06″N 0°20′11″W
- Country: France
- Region: Pays de la Loire
- Department: Mayenne
- Arrondissement: Mayenne
- Canton: Villaines-la-Juhel

Government
  - Mayor (2020–2026): Didier Ledauphin
- Area^{1}: 38.13 km^{2} (14.72 sq mi)
- Elevation: 194 m (636 ft)
- Highest elevation: 251 m (823 ft)
- Lowest elevation: 133 m (436 ft)
- Population (2023): 1,314
  - Density: 34.46/km^{2} (89.25/sq mi)
- Time zone: UTC+01:00 (CET)
  - Summer (DST): UTC+02:00 (CEST)
- INSEE/Postal code: 53121 /53250
- ^{1} French Land Register data, which excludes lakes, ponds, glaciers > 1 km^{2} (0.386 sq mi or 247 acres) and river estuaries.

Javron-les-Chapelles (French pronunciation: [ʒavʁɔ̃ le ʃapɛl]) is a commune in the Mayenne department in north-western France. It was created in 1973 by the merger of two former communes: Javron and Les Chapelles.

== Geography ==
The commune is made up of the following collection of villages and hamlets, Les Chapelles, Chevrigny, La Hussonnière, Javron, Javron-les-Chapelles, L'Écarderie, La Laire, Chattemoue and La Couasnière.

== Points of Interest ==
=== National Heritage sites ===
- Église Saint-Jean-Baptiste - a church, which was listed as a Monument historique in 1931.

== Notable people ==
- Victor Fanneau de La Horie - (1766 – 1812) a French general, conspirator against Napoleon, and godfather of Victor Hugo was born here.

== See also ==
- Communes of the Mayenne department
