= Nicolas Frochot =

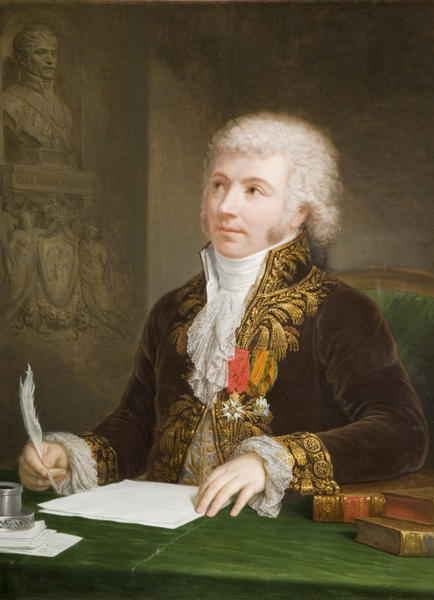

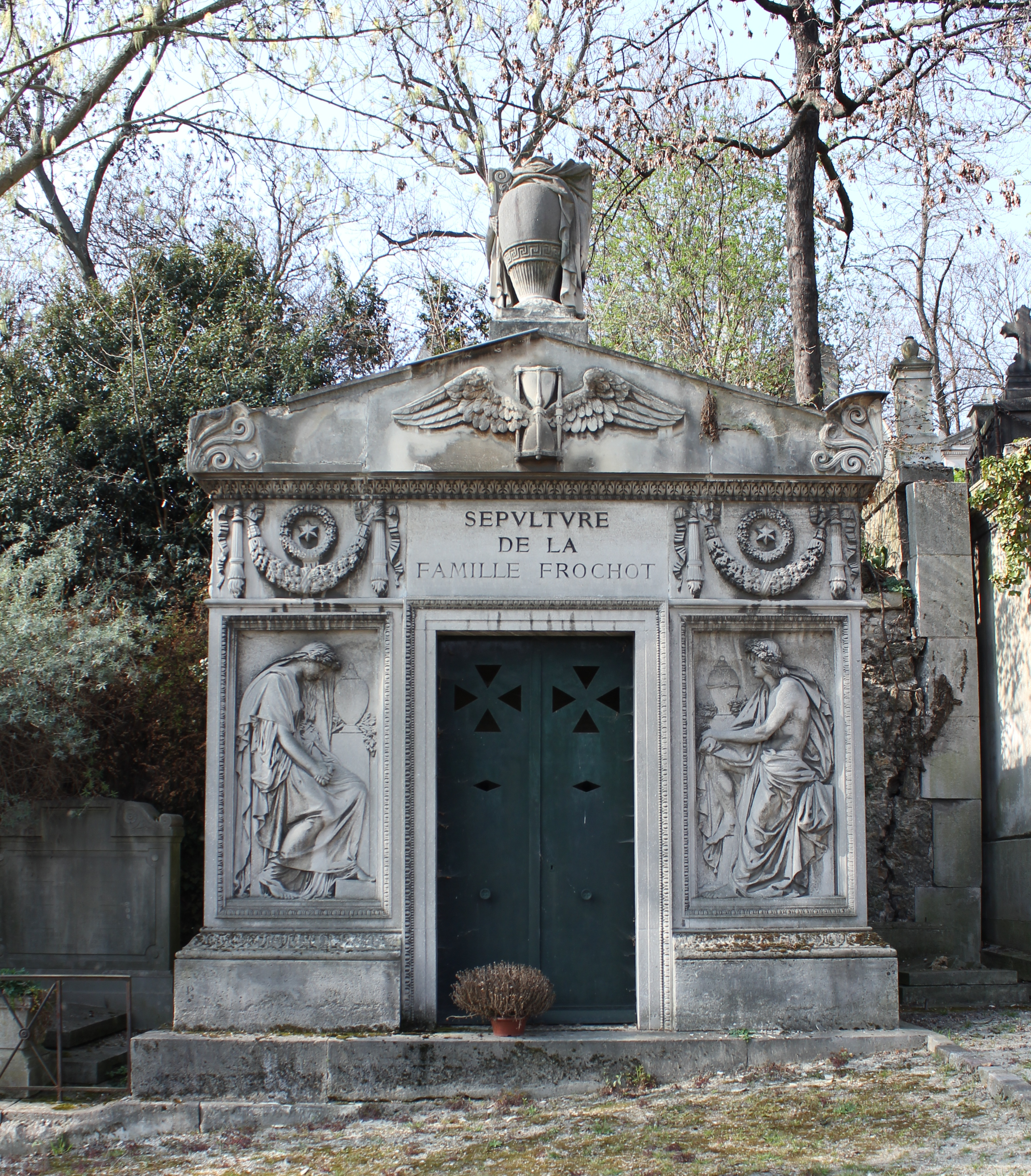
Frochot family tomb at the cimetière du Père-Lachaise.

Nicolas Thérèse Benoît Frochot (French: [nikɔla teʁɛz bənwa fʁɔʃo]; 20 March 1761 - 29 July 1828) was a senior French civil servant and conseiller d'État, as well as the first holder of the office of Prefect of the Seine.

== Life ==
Born in Dijon into a middle-class family, his father was Jean Etienne, who wore "the oratorian collet for seven years" before becoming advocate to the parliament of Dijon in 1754. Nicolas' mother was Antoinette Geneviève Charpy. In 1785 he married Denise Petit (1757–1832), daughter of a notary and royal provost at Aignay-le-Duc, who he succeeded. The marriage made him brother-in-law to Claude-Auguste Petit de Beauverger.

He was elected a deputy of the third estate for the bailliage of Montagne à Châtillon in the estates general on 25 March 1789.

== Bibliography (in French) ==
- Archives nationales, base Leonore, LH/1039/57, dossier de Légion d'honneur de Nicolas Thérèse Benoît Frochot (avec extrait de baptême). Numérisé.
- Alexandre Burtard, « Sur la piste des orientations artistiques de Nicolas Frochot, premier préfet de la Seine sous le Consulat et l’Empire », Livraisons de l'histoire de l'architecture [En ligne], 26 | 2013, mis en ligne le 10 décembre 2015, consulté le 19 mai 2021. URL : http://journals.openedition.org/lha/151 ; DOI : https://doi.org/10.4000/lha.151
- Charles Hubert Lavollée, « Souvenirs d’un préfet de Paris sous la révolution et l’empire », Revue des Deux Mondes, 77, 1868, p. 443–469 d'après le livre de Passy). Wikisource.
- Louis-Paulin Passy, Frochot, préfet de la Seine, Évreux : à l’imprimerie d'Auguste Hérissey, 1867, 572 p.
- Jean Riche, Frochot, préfet de la Seine sous le Premier Empire, sa carrière pendant l'époque révolutionnaire, Dijon, Société pour l'histoire du droit et des institutions des anciens pays bourguignons, comtois et romands, 1961. Numérisé sur gallica.
- "Nicolas Frochot", in Adolphe Robert and Gaston Cougny, Dictionnaire des parlementaires français (1789–1891), Bourloton, Paris, 1889 Edition details Wikisource
