= Victor Fanneau de La Horie =

French general (1766–1812)

- Born: 5 January 1766; Javron-les-Chapelles, Mayenne, Kingdom of France
- Died: 29 October 1812 (aged 46); Paris, French Empire
- Military career
- Allegiance: France
- Service years: 1793–1803
- Rank: Général de brigade
- Conflicts: French Revolutionary Wars

Victor Claude Alexandre Fanneau de La Horie (5 January 1766 – 29 October 1812) was a French general, conspirator against Napoleon, and godfather of Victor Hugo.

== Early life ==
He was born on 5 January 1766 in Javron-les-Chapelles.

== Military career ==
Victor Fanneau de La Horie served the First French Republic in the Army of the Rhine with Joseph Hugo and became close friends with the younger man. He was the godfather and namesake of Joseph's son Victor Hugo. He served in the revolutionary armies, but souring on Napoleon joined the Moreau conspiracy. When the plan fell apart in 1801, he was proscribed and went into hiding on the estate of Joseph Hugo. There, the young Victor Hugo got to know the general.

== Capture and execution ==
After fleeing abroad, he returned to France in 1808 and was unduly arrested and unlawfully held at La Force Prison. He was freed during the Malet coup of 1812, but after the coup's failure, he was recaptured.

On 29 October 1812 he was executed in Paris under Napoleon's orders.
