= La Force Prison =

Parisian prison, 1780–1845

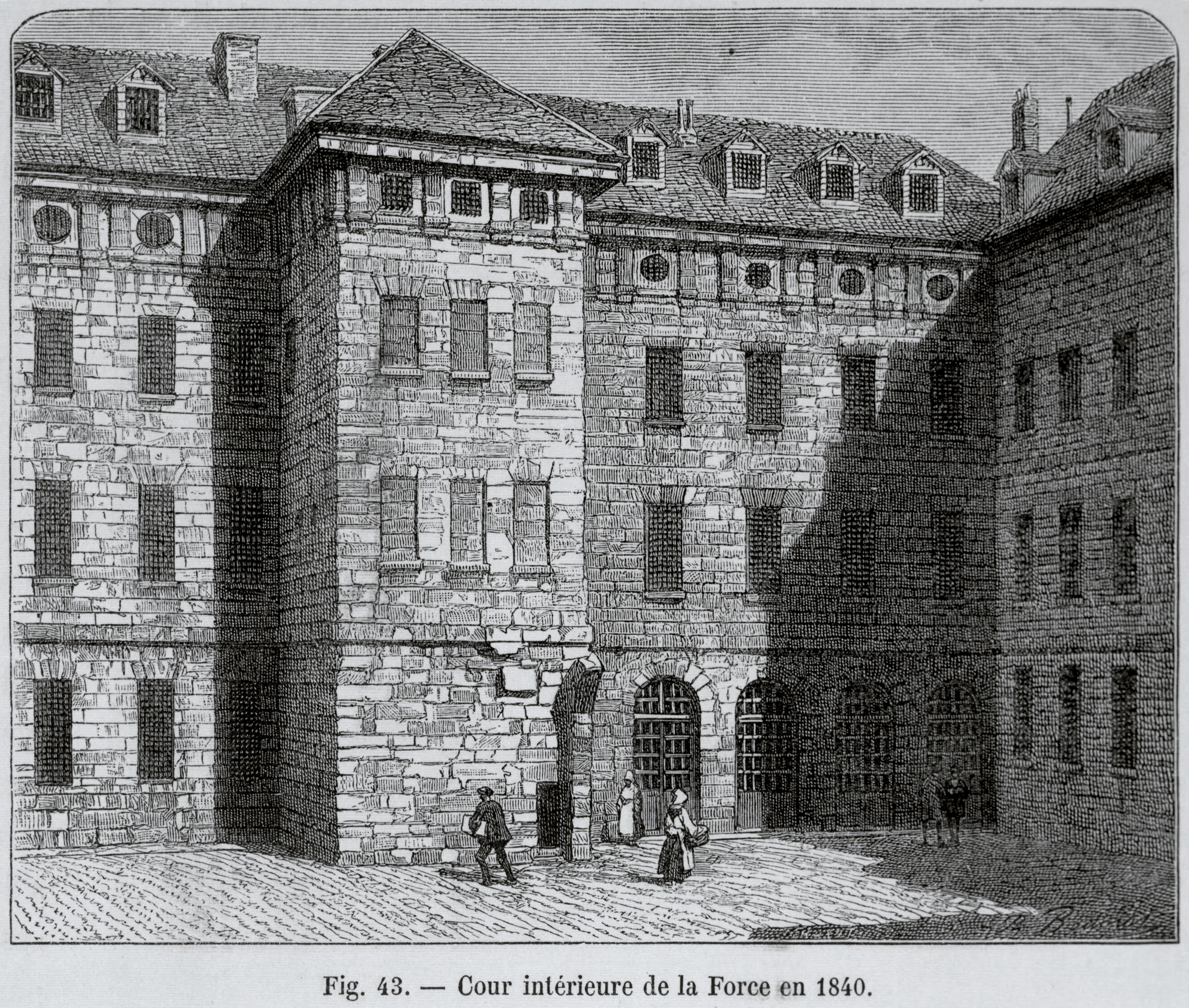
- Inner court of La Force in 1840
- Interactive map of La Force Prison
- Location: Paris, France; 48°51′20″N 2°21′20″E
- Opened: 1780
- Closed: 1845
- Former name: Hôtel de la Force; La Grande Force; La Petite Force

Notable prisoners
- Princesse de Lamballe; Jean Sylvain Bailly; Pierre-Jean de Béranger; Constantin-François Chassebœuf; Claude Fournier; Pierre Choderlos de Laclos; Victor Claude Alexandre Fanneau de Lahorie; Claude Ledoux; Pierre Victurnien Vergniaud

La Force Prison was a French prison located in the Rue du Roi de Sicile, in what is now the 4th arrondissement of Paris. Originally known as the Hôtel de la Force, the buildings formed the private residence of Henri-Jacques Nompar de Caumont, duc de la Force. Towards the end of the reign of Louis XIV, the Hôtel de la Force was divided into two parts, one of which took the name of the Hôtel de Brienne, and had its entrance in the Rue Pavée; the other retained its former name and had its entrance in the Rue du Roi de Sicile.

== La Grande Force ==
After passing through several hands, the buildings were acquired, in 1754, by the war ministry, and were transformed, in 1780, into a prison. The Hôtel de la Force was renamed La Grande Force and was intended for debtors and those charged with civil offences. The prison consisted of several buildings, each of which had a separate yard. The most airy building was situated in the centre between two yards planted with trees. It was there that such prisoners were detained who could incur some expense. On the left was the infirmary.

== La Petite Force ==
At the same time as the Hôtel de la Force was being converted into a prison, the Hôtel de Brienne was demolished, and a new prison for prostitutes was erected on its site, which was called La Petite Force. The front presented a somber aspect. It was ornamented with vermiculated rustics and the entrance was formed by an elliptical arch. It was three stories high and was surmounted by a Doric cornice. In its construction, neither wood nor plaster were employed, the whole being built of stone bound together by iron bars. It was located adjacent to the Hôtel de Lamoignon.

During the French Revolution, this prison was used for political prisoners, and it was here that the close friend of Marie Antoinette, the Princesse de Lamballe was taken. La Force came under attack by violent mobs on 3 September 1792, and the four following days: one hundred and sixty prisoners, among whom were three priests and the Princesse de Lamballe, were massacred there.

The Grande Force had housed only male prisoners and the Petite Force had been used exclusively for women, however, in 1830 the two prisons were united, and placed under one management. The whole prison was then converted to house males committed for trial. These prisoners were divided into two separate groups: the old offenders into one ward, the young and comparatively innocent into another.

The prisoners slept in large and well ventilated chambers, and the boys each had a small apartment which contained a single bed. The prisoners had the privilege of working if they wished, but they were not obliged to do so, inasmuch as they were on remand and not yet convicted of crime. There was a department for the sick, a bathing-room, a parlor, and an advocate's room, where the prisoners could hold conversations with their legal defenders.

The two prisons of La Force were demolished in 1845, and the only remaining part is a section of wall adjoining the City of Paris Historical Library.

== Notable prisoners ==
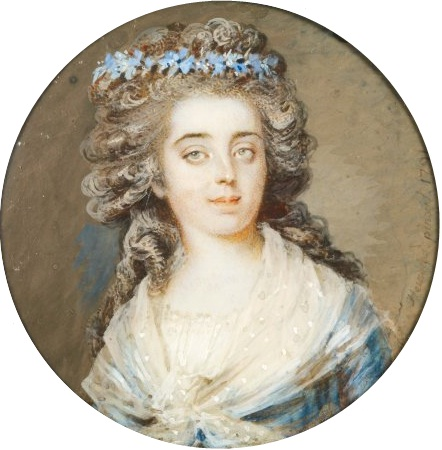
Portrait of princess de Lamballe

Detainees included:

- Benjamin Nicolas Marie Appert
- Jean Sylvain Bailly
- Pierre-Jean de Béranger
- Aimé Picquet du Boisguy
- Edme Castaing
- George Henry Caunter
- Constantin-François Chassebœuf
- Clotworthy Skeffington, 2nd Earl of Massereene, Irish nobleman
- Claude Fournier
- Évariste Galois
- Pierre Choderlos de Laclos
- Victor Claude Alexandre Fanneau de Lahorie
- Claude Ledoux
- Simon-Nicolas-Henri Linguet
- Gregor MacGregor
- Marie Angélique de Mackau
- Francisco de Miranda
- Anne de Noailles
- Marie Thérèse Louise of Savoy, Princesse de Lamballe
- Pierre Victurnien Vergniaud and 12 other Girondist deputies

Fictional detainees included:

- Charles Darnay (fictional character in Charles Dickens' A Tale of Two Cities)
- Lucien de Rubempré and Jacques Collins (fictional characters in Honoré de Balzac's Illusions perdues and Splendeurs et misères des courtisanes"
- Thénardier (fictional character in Victor Hugo's Les Misérables)
- Benedetto (fictional character in Alexandre Dumas' The Count of Monte-Cristo)
- James Dillon (fictional character in John Hobart Caunter's The Fellow Commoner (1836))

== Footnotes ==
Attribution

== Sources ==
- Bartlett, David W. (1890). Paris: With Pen and Pencil; Its People and Literature, Its Life and Business. New York: Hurst.
- "London Times, Monday, 10 September, 1792". British Newspaper Coverage of the French Revolution: The September Massacres. Oldsite.english.ucsb.edu.
- Galignani, A. and Galignani, W. (1827). Galignani's New Paris Guide, or, Stranger's Companion Through the French Metropolis (15th ed.). Paris: A. and W. Galignani. p. 488.
- The History of Paris: from the earliest period to the present day ... Vol. II. London: G. B. Whittaker; A. and W. Galignani. 1825.
- Malcomson, A. P. W., comp. (1972). The extraordinary career of the 2nd Earl of Massereene, 1743-1805; a volume of select documents with explanatory notes and introduction by A.P.W. Malcomson and a foreword by the Rt. Hon. The Viscount Massereene and Ferrard, D. L. Ulster Characters. Belfast: Her Majesty's Stationery Office. ISBN 0337022828.
