= Hugues Alexandre Joseph Meunier =

French general (1751–1831)

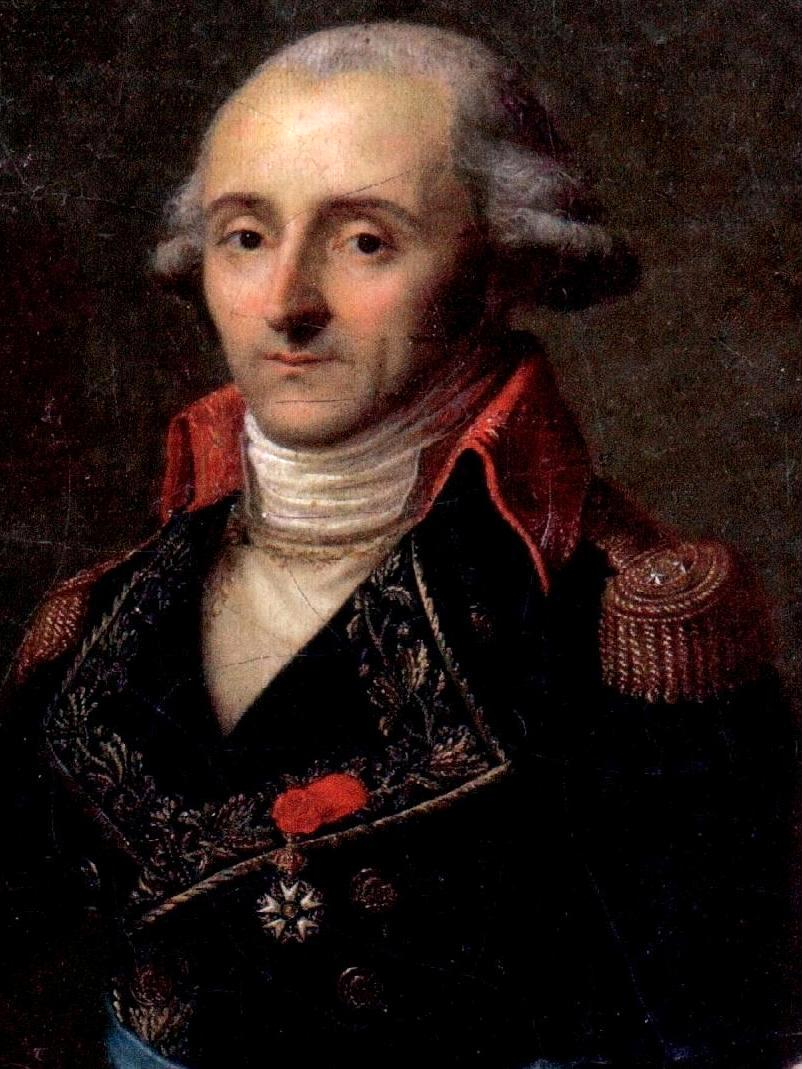

Hugues Alexandre Joseph Meunier (French pronunciation: [yɡ alɛksɑ̃dʁ ʒozɛf mønje]; 23 November 1758 or 1751 – 9 December 1831) was a French Army general during the French Revolutionary Wars and the Napoleonic Wars.

== Biography ==
=== 1768–1795 ===
Born in Mont-Louis to the mercenary general Hugues Meunier, he became a cadet in the Lyonnais Regiment on 30 June 1768, aged nine, with the rank of sub-lieutenant. He was promoted to lieutenant in 1774 and captain in 1782, both in the same regiment. He fought in the naval campaigns of 1779 to 1783 under the command of Charles-Gustave de Falkenhayn, including service at the sieges of Mahon and Gibraltar. He was made a chevalier de Saint-Louis for long service in 1791 and lieutenant-colonel of the 34th Line Infantry Regiment on 5 February 1792. He thus served in the Army of the North under generals Gilbert du Motier de La Fayette and Charles-François Dumouriez, commanding the 1st Grenadier Battalion in its reserves from 1 August to 15 September 1792. In that role he converged to guarantee the armée du Grand-Pré's safe retreat to Sainte-Menehould, bringing in all the position's artillery under enemy fire and beat off several Prussian attacks at the entrance to Senuc wood. However, in taking his battalion and a squadron under Chamborand in to support, he was attacked by seven enemy squadrons protected by light artillery and was badly wounded in the arm by a sabre.

Wishing to reward his services, the commander in chief made him a colonel on the field of battle, ranking in his regiment from 24th of the previous month, the date at which a vacancy had appeared at the rank of colonel. Pierre Riel de Beurnonville, then a general and minister for war, also showed the government's appreciation by sending him a fully equipped horse. After recovering from his wounds, Meunier returned to the Army of the North, in which he now acted as a brigadier general. He was commanded to man the defence lines at Pont-à-Marcq and Mons-en-Pévèle and given a force of 8,000 men to do so. Next he commanded the citadel at Lille when that city was threatened by the enemy – he organised eight newly raised battalions, then (as a result of recruiting) moved to the Vendée to command 1st Battalion of the 34th Line Infantry Regiment. There he fought against the Quiberon Expedition and was made a brigadier general by the commander in chief Lazare Hoche on the field of battle on 16 July 1795 – this rank was confirmed on 23 August.

=== Republic to Empire ===
Later in 1795 he was put in command of one of the divisions of the Army of the Coasts of Brest, later known as the Army of the Coasts of the Ocean. Soon Hoche, Louis Thomas Villaret de Joyeuse and Laurent Truguet put him in command of a planned expedition to capture the Cape of Good Hope, though this never came to fruition. Hoche then ordered Meunier to raise 17,000 men as the second half of the planned Expédition d'Irlande and put Meunier in command of them. Hoche and his invasion force set off for Ireland on 15 December 1796 but when it reached the open sea the frigate carrying the general was separated from the main force by a storm and the other ships dispersed and headed back to Brest.

In September 1797 Meunier was assigned to the armée d'Angleterre for a planned invasion of the United Kingdom – its commander was Napoleon Bonaparte. On 13 April 1798 he was put on the military committee and on 16 October 1798 was made head of the Dépôt de la Guerre. On 2 December 1799 he took command of Finistère, which he had already exercised. He actively put Brest on a war footing, sending a memo on the topic to Napoleon (now First Consul). The commander-in-chief Guillaume Marie-Anne Brune praised Meunier in a report to the government. His successor in that role was general Frédéric-Christophe Houdelot – at the time of the handover, they both led the operation which forced Georges Cadoudal to surrender.

In year X (1801–1802) Meunier moved to 12th Military Division. He was made a member of the Légion d'honneur on 11 December 1803 and a commander in the same order on 14 June 1804. On 29 April he was made a member of the commission set up to write a military code, but this was dissolved before completing its work. Meunier had been attached to the section charged with editing the ordnance on infantry manoeuvres – he completed the work and presented it to the government.

=== First Empire ===
In 1806 he was made part of the Grande Armée, coming to Paris to wait for orders on 21 September 1807. He was retired on 23 November 1807 and succeeded Régis Barthélemy Mouton-Duvernet as inspector of several line infantry and artillery regiments on 26 December 1807. He was granted lands in Westphalia and the title of baron de l'Empire by Napoleon on 19 March 1808, who on that date also made him inspector of the infantry in the 21st Military Division on 30 April and later commander of the Méditerranée department in Tuscany.

Meunier briefly retired for health reasons on 14 October 1809 but otherwise remained in his position until 21 June 1810, when he was put in charge of a branch of the Hôtel des Invalides in Louvain. From 1 July 1812 to 30 July 1814 he was in charge of the École militaire de Saint-Cyr. On 10 August 1814 he was promoted to lieutenant general, on 16 August 1814 he was made a chevalier de Saint-Louis and on 22 September 1814 commander of the Vienne department (12th Military Division). He commanded it until 17 February 1815. A decree of 30 March 1815 made him commander of the École militaire de La Flèche and he finally retired on 1 August that year. He died at Poitiers in 1831.

== Works ==
- (in French) Évolutions par brigades, ou Instruction servant de développement aux manœuvres de ligne indiquées dans les règlements. Ouvrage dédié au Duc de Berri, Paris, 1814, in-8°, avec 16 planches.

== Bibliography ==
- Biographie universelle ancienne et moderne Supplément.
- Six, Georges (1934). "Meunier (Hugues-Alexandre-Joseph, baron)". Dictionnaire biographique des généraux et amiraux français de la Révolution et de l'Empire: 1792–1814 (in French). Vol. 2. Paris: Librairie Historique et Nobilaire. p. 188.
- Mullié, Charles (1852). "Meunier (Hugues-Alexandre-Joseph, baron)" . Biographie des célébrités militaires des armées de terre et de mer de 1789 à 1850 (in French). Paris: Poignavant et Compagnie.
- Côte S.H.A.T. : 7 Yd 671.
- "Notice no. LH/1852/1". Base Léonore (in French).
