= Hugues Meunier =

Hugues Meunier (18 December 1721 – 24 July 1792) was a brigadier general in the French army.

== Life ==
Born in Paris, Meunier entered the army in 1737 as a private in the Régiment de Nice, rising to grenadier in 1743, sergeant in 1744, sub-lieutenant in 1747 and lieutenant in 1750. During an attack as part of the Battle of Minorca on 20 May 1756 he was buried by an exploding mine and later the same year was made a chevalier de Saint-Louis.

In 1759 he was made an aide major, in 1761 a captain and in 1765 a capitaine aide major. In 1771, he was made a major in the Régiment de La Fère, in which he became a lieutenant-colonel in 1773 (a rank confirmed on 5 June 1781). On 25 July 1791 he was made colonel and commander of the 70th Infantry Regiment. Whilst commanding his regiment he moved to fort de Tournoux in Perpignan, becoming adjutant-general on the staff there on 17 July 1792.

On 22 July 1792 Meunier rose to maréchal de camp in the armée du Midi, but died on the road at Les Vans two days later, whilst en route with his regiment to put down the royalist uprising fomented by the comte de Saillans. His son Hugues Alexandre Joseph Meunier (1758-1831) also became a general.
