= Louis Albert Guislain Bacler d'Albe =

French artist (1761–1824)

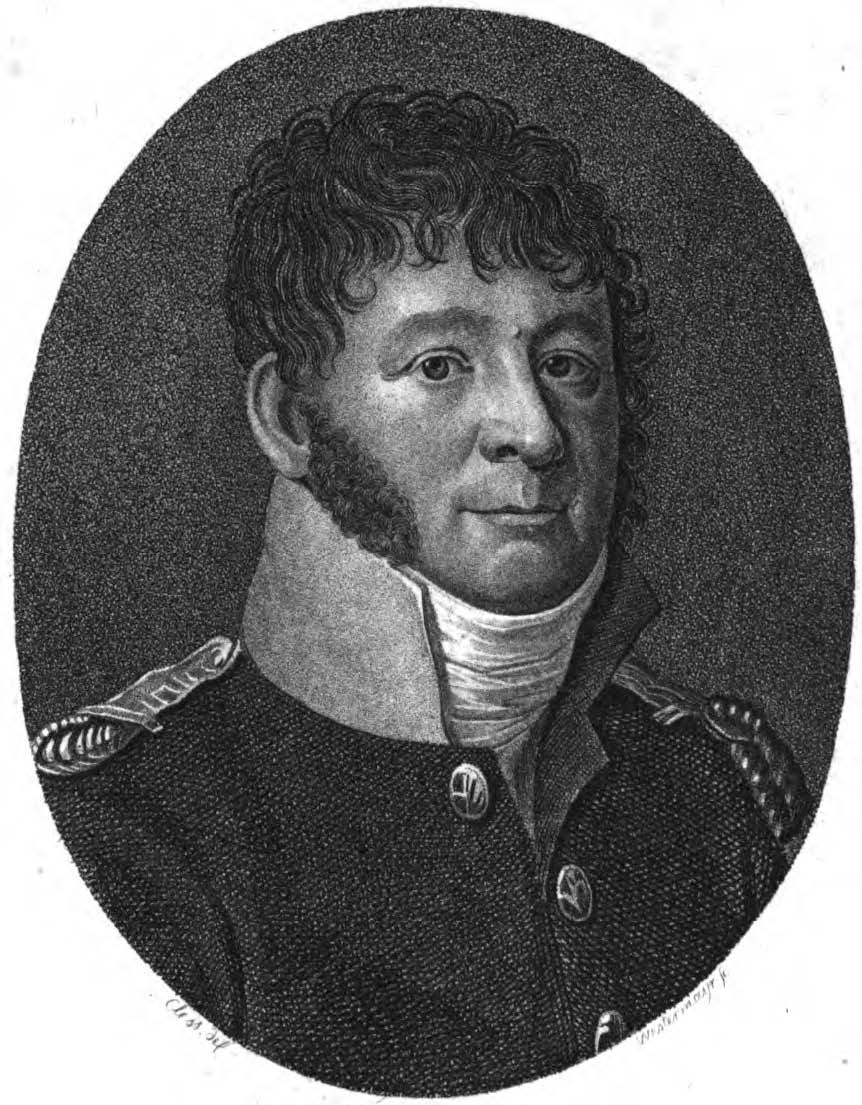
- Guislain, 1805
- Born: 21 October 1761; Saint-Pol-sur-Ternoise, France
- Died: 12 September 1824 (aged 62) Sèvres, France
- Allegiance: French First Republic; French Empire; First Restoration; French Empire
- Service years: 1793–1815
- Rank: Brigadier general
- Conflicts: French Revolutionary Wars; War of the First Coalition; Siege of Lyon; Siege of Toulon; Italian campaign; Battle of Arcole
- Awards: Nobility of the First French Empire; Officer of the Legion of Honour; Order of Saint Louis
- Children: 2

Louis Albert Guislain, Baron Bacler d’Albe (French pronunciation: [bakle dalb]; October 21, 1761 – September 12, 1824) was a French artist, as well as the map-maker and closest strategic advisor of Napoleon from 1796 until 1814.

Bacler d'Albe was one of Napoleon's longest-lasting companions: a fellow artilleryman at the Siege of Toulon, he was listed in Napoleon's will, drawn up in Saint Helena in 1821, amongst the names of educators for his son. He was Napoleon's most trusted strategic military adviser between 1799 and 1814 as chief of his personal topographical committee.

He was considered one of the best map-makers of his time. He perfected the technique of relief shading, directed the Dépôt de la Guerre, and made the first homogeneous maps of Italy and then of Europe (with the title "Map of the Emperor"), lost during the retreat of Russia.

He was also considered an innovator in military art, using both his topographical knowledge and sensitivity for human detail, and a talented engraver, known for his landscapes of Savoy and of other scenes throughout Europe during the Empire's campaigns.

== Early life ==
Louis Albert Guislain Bacler d'Albe was born in Artois in 1761. His father was a former treasurer of the Toul Regiment.

He left for the south when he was 24 with his young wife and made a successful career as a painter in the Mont-Blanc region between 1785 and 1793. He lived in Sallanches, where his two children, Joseph Albert (22 July 1789) and Marie Louis François (12 January 1792), were born.

== Military career ==
He enlisted to fight for the Republic in 1793 and participated in the siege of Lyon and the siege of Toulon and became captain of artillery.

He then was assigned to the Italian army between 1794 and 1797. He became the geography and cartography officer because of his artistic talents. He participated in the first campaign of Italy under the orders of Napoléon Bonaparte and notably fought in the Battle of Arcole. Bonaparte chose him as an artist and painter in order to popularise his victories. In this capacity, Bacler d'Albe painted one of the first portraits of Napoleon, in Milan in Year V (late 1796 - late 1797 in the Republican calendar). Named director of the Dépôt de la Guerre by Napoleon, he mapped Italy between 1797 and 1799, while Napoleon had returned to France.

He re-entered Napoleon's personal service in 1799, from which date until the fall of the First Empire he was entirely devoted to this personal service. As director of the Dépôt de la Guerre based in Paris between 1799 and 1804, he promoted the standardisation of French cartography. At the same time, he pursued his personal endeavours as an artist.

He became director of the topographical office of the Emperor from 1804 until 1814, and followed Napoleon everywhere both in peacetime and on military campaigns, and was his closest advisor on strategic planning. He created the Carte de l'Empereur, the first homogenous map of Europe, at a 1:100,000 scale.

As director of the Dépôt de la Guerre between 1814 and 1815, he saved from pillage the Cassini map, the only complete map of France existing at the time. Deprived of work by the definitive fall of the Empire in 1815 and kept under surveillance by the monarchy, he retired to his house in Sèvres, where he continued his work as a lithographic artist. He created hundreds of engravings from his sketches taken throughout his campaigns in Europe. He died at Sèvres in 1824.

== Strategic advisor to the Emperor ==
Bacler d'Albe holds a place amongst Napoleon's contemporaries and was one of the closest people to the Emperor.

Bacler d'Albe spent an exceptionally long time close to Napoleon. He fought with him at the Siege of Toulon in 1793, and worked directly under him from 1794 until March 1814. He was a part of Napoleon's intimate "interior cabinet" and at Napoleon's death, Bacler d'Albe was mentioned various times in Napoleon's will, who wished for him to participate in the education of his son.

Bacler d'Albe was Napoleon's personal cartographer from 1804 to 1814. He combined all of the geographic and military information available on a map he kept up to date for the emperor both in peacetime and during conflicts, making him Napoleon's closest advisor. His role went beyond just cartography however, and he is considered the only advisor to have participated in Napoleon's strategic decision making.

In practical terms,

- he was the only person to help prepare the strategic decision of the Emperor, working in his tent with him on the eves of battles, answering his questions and advising him,
- he depicted and made certain the terrain of the country for Napoleon. Historian Frédéric Masson wrote: "Gifted with prestigious ability, d'Albe was capable, from only a map and without making a single wrong line, of creating the perspective of the battlefields on which the Emperor planned to make battle. In these gradients, these curves, these black and white dots, he saw and made visible, real, and lifelike, not abstract terrain, but to some extent the real terrain of future battles.
- he planned marches and calculated bombardments.

The general staff of the army, commanded by Louis-Alexandre Berthier, transmitted and defined Napoleon's orders, but without taking part in the decision making. According to Colonel Vachée, "No other officer, including Berthier, seems to us to have been so closely associated and involved with the thinking of Napoleon. In this way, Bacler d'Albe held amongst the general Imperial staff a unique position: he alone carried out what must be consider the highest functions of the general staff, which consisted of preparing the decisions of the Emperor." Consequently, military historian Ronald Pawly wrote that "during wartime, Bacler d'Albe was the second most important person in the Imperial headquarters."

Bacler d'Albe's office is therefore considered to have been "the laboratory in which the ideas of Napoleon were germinated" (General Bonnal), "the starting point for all preparation for future campaigns" (Ronald Pawly), and "the most secret nerve center of the genius' sanctuary" (the Napoleonic society).

At the Tuileries Palace, Bacler d'Albe's office was next door to Napoleon's chambers. While on campaigns, his tent was pitched next to that of the Emperor. Bacler d'Albe's endless work for such a demanding master brought him great honours, as he was promoted to Colonel in 1807, and later Brigadier general in 1813. He was made a noble of the First French Empire in 1810.

== See also ==
- Napoleonic Wars
- French Art
