= Lieutenant en second =

Lieutenant en second was a junior officer rank in the French Royal Army prior to the French Revolution. Like most of the officer ranks in the Royal Army, it was dominated by nobles. High-ranking nobles entering military service during their teenage years would serve in the rank at ages as young as 15 or 16 years old before rapidly being promoted. One such example was Louis des Balbes de Berton de Crillon, duc de Mahon, who joined the Régiment du Roi (King's Regiment) in 1734, aged 16, as a lieutenant en second before being promoted the following year to lieutenant en premier. Lesser nobles would stay in the rank for longer, while the few commoners who had been able to become officer of fortune might remain as lieutenants en second until they died or retired.
