= Louis des Balbes de Berton de Crillon, 1st Duke of Mahón =

French-born military officer and nobleman

The Most Excellent The Duke of Mahón GE
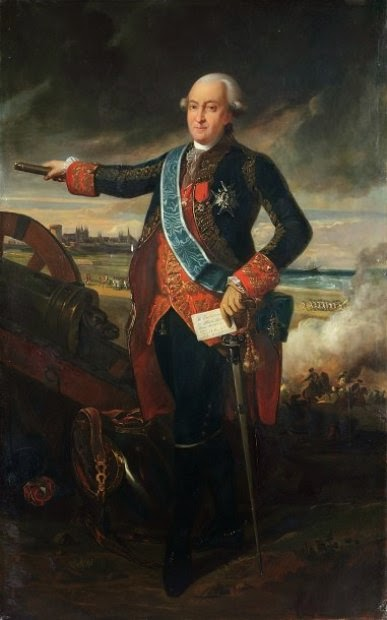
- Portrayed in uniform of Captain general of the Army
- Born: 27 February 1717; Avignon
- Died: June 1796 (aged 79); Madrid
- Occupation: Soldier
- Known for: Invasion of Minorca, Great Siege of Gibraltar
- Title: Duke of Mahón; Duke of Crillon; Knight of Order of the Golden Fleece; Captain-General of Valencia and Murcia
- Spouses: Françoise-Marie-Elizabeth Couvay, Florence-Radagonde-Louise-Eléonore-Julie Bruneau de la Rabatelière, Josephe-Anathase-Roman-Garmon Spinosa de Los-Monteras
- Children: Louis-Alexandre-Nolasque-Félix de Balbe Berton, François-Félix Dorothée, Louis-Antoine-François de Paule, Marie-Thérèse-Virginie-Françoise de Paul
- Parent(s): François Félix de Berton des Balbes, Marie-Thérèse de Fabry de Moncault
- Relatives: Louis-Athanase des Balbes de Berton de Crillon

Louis des Balbes de Berton de Crillon, 1st Duke of Mahón (22 February 1717 – June 1796) was a French-born military officer and nobleman who reached the rank of Captain general of the Army. He became a soldier at the age of 16 and served with distinction in the French Royal Army before transferring to the Spanish Army, which was allied with France for much of the 18th century. A member of a distinguished military family, he was widely admired for his personal courage, courtesy, and chivalry. By the end of his life he had risen to the highest military rank in Spain and it was said that he had served in 68 engagements.

He participated in many of the major conflicts of the 18th century, including the War of the Polish Succession, the War of the Austrian Succession, the Seven Years' War and the Anglo-Spanish War. His most famous achievement was the successful invasion of Minorca in 1781, in which he defeated a British garrison and returned the island to Spain, although his efforts the following year to recapture Gibraltar from the British were a notable failure. He ended his career in the service of the Spanish Bourbon monarchy, which had been allied with France prior to the French Revolution, and died in Madrid.

== Early life and career ==
Born in Avignon on 22 February 1717, Crillon was a member of a distinguished family that had originated in Chieri, Piedmont. His branch of the family had a long history of military service to the French crown. A descendant of the famous 16th-century general Louis des Balbes de Berton de Crillon ("the brave Crillon"), he was the son of the 1st Duke of Crillon, François Félix de Berton des Balbes, and Marie-Thérèse de Fabry de Moncault. Louis was the first-born of the couple's six children (four boys and two girls).

Crillon joined the Régiment du Roi (King's Regiment) in 1734, aged 16, as a lieutenant en second and participated in France's Italian campaign during the War of the Polish Succession. He was soon promoted to lieutenant en premier and took part in a number of notable actions, including the Battle of San Pietro, under the command of the Marshal de Villars. He remained with the regiment until 1738 when he was promoted to the rank of colonel in the Régiment de Bretagne (Regiment of Brittany).

== Service in the War of the Austrian Succession ==
In 1742, he served with distinction in Bavaria under the command of François d'Harcourt, duc d'Harcourt during the War of the Austrian Succession. Crillon won particular renown for his tenacious defence of Landau an der Isar against a 10,000–strong attacking force led by the Grand Duke of Tuscany. When he was asked to surrender, Crillon told the enemy general that he could not as he had a name and a personal reputation to defend. The general is said to have replied, "Sir, we know and believe [this] since the beginning of the campaign; but give up, brave Crillon, you will be taken." He was captured after a thirteen-hour battle but was released eight days later in a prisoner exchange.

Crillon served again under d'Harcourt in 1744 when the latter commanded the Army of the Moselle during its campaigns along the Rhine. He participated in the siege of Fribourg and spent the winter in Swabia under the command of Marshal Coigny as colonel of an infantry regiment. In May 1745, he fought in the major Battle of Fontenoy near Tournai in modern-day Belgium and captured nearly 50 pieces of artillery from the Dutch, British, and Hanoverian alliance opposing the French. The following month he was appointed brigadier. On 10 July, he fought in what the French termed the battle of the Mésle at Dendermonde near Ghent, leading 8,000 men to victory against a British, Austrian and Dutch force. He then took part in the captures of Ghent, Ostend and Nieuwpoort.

In 1746 Crillon transferred to the command of the duc de Boufflers to serve in the headquarters of the Army of Flanders during the siege of Mons and rejoined the royal army following the city's capture. He brought the king news of the capture of the town and castle of Namur in October of that year, and was appointed to the rank of maréchal de camp, the junior of the two officer general ranks of the French Army. He took part in the 1747 campaign against the Republic of Genoa, serving in the Army of Italy under the Marshal de Belle-Isle, and was present during the captures of Nice, Villefranche, Montalbán and Ventimiglia.

== Service in the Seven Years' War ==
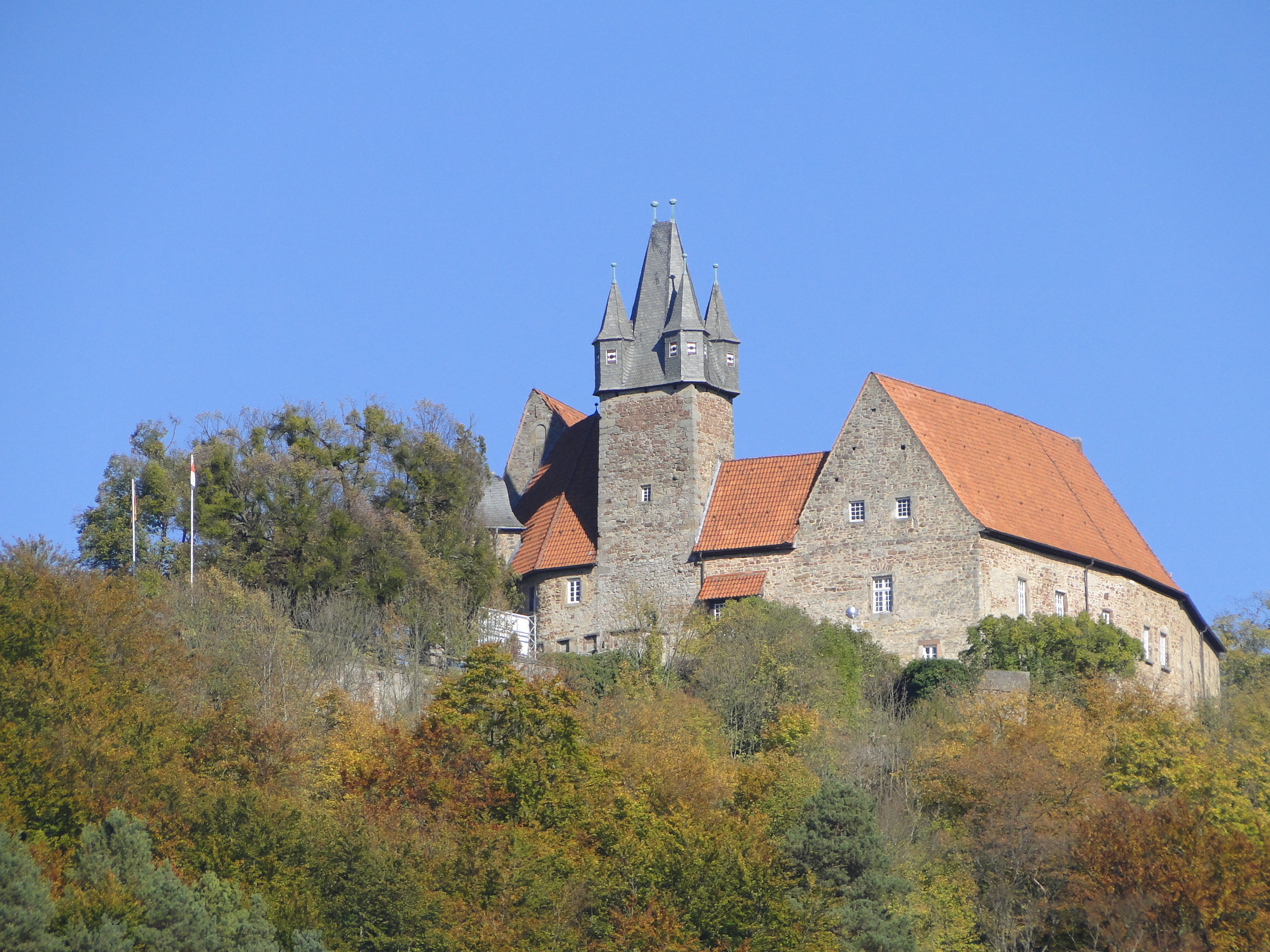
Schloss Spangenberg, captured by Crillon on 9 November 1758

Almost a decade of peace ended with the outbreak of the Seven Years' War in Europe. Crillon resumed active service with the Army of Germany (Reichsarmee) in 1757, when he first served in a separate corps commanded by the Prince of Soubise on the frontiers of Saxony and then joined the French Grand Army. He defended the city of Weißenfels in October 1757, commanding four imperial battalions and 17 companies of French grenadiers. He executed a retreat, but on 5 November he was injured when he had his horse shot out from under him at the Battle of Rossbach.

Transferred to the command of the Marshal de Richelieu, he served for a while in the Landgraviate of Hesse-Kassel. He fought at Lutzenburg in October 1758, where he took 400 prisoners, and moved on to take the strategic castle of Spangenberg. Although it was heavily fortified, he took the garrison by surprise on 9 November. Finding that the drawbridge was down, his troops took the garrison prisoner and seized their armoury, including 18 cannon, 307 guns and 44 barrels of powder. He returned to Flanders in May 1759 and was appointed to command French forces in Picardy in 1760.

== Service with Spain ==
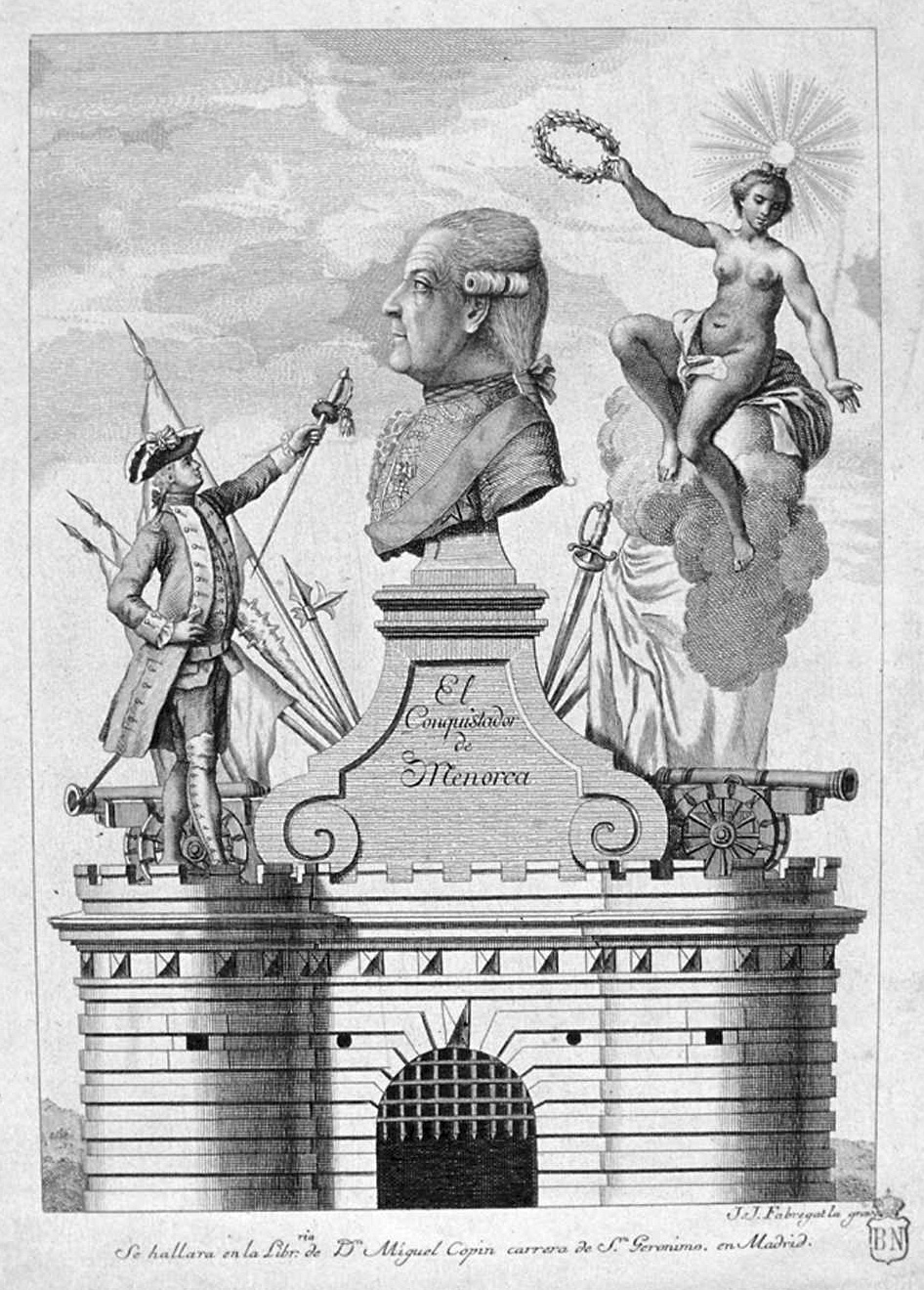
A 1782 Spanish print commemorating Crillon's victory on Minorca

In 1762 Crillon moved to Spain, where he served as a lieutenant-general – the highest rank in the Bourbon armies – and was made a Knight of the Order of Charles III in 1780. During the Anglo-Spanish War, when Spain and France allied with the Americans to fight Britain, he was given command of a Spanish army tasked with capturing Minorca from the British. The army landed on the island on 19 August 1781 and laid siege to the British garrison in Fort St. Philip at Mahon. The siege was concluded successfully on 5 February 1782 when the British surrendered, for which Crillon was made a grandee of Spain and took the title of Duke of Crillon-Mahon. After capturing Menorca, he ordered all Jews to leave in four days. At that time, the Jewish community consisted of about 500 people and they were transported from Menorca in four Spanish ships to the port of Marseille.

He was subsequently put in charge of the joint French and Spanish force that had been besieging Gibraltar since 1779. Despite his efforts, Gibraltar proved impregnable and peace was restored in 1783.

Crillon's service with Spain was further rewarded in 1783 with the title of Knight of the Golden Fleece. He was appointed captain-general of the kingdoms of Valencia and Murcia. He remained in Spain during the years of the French Revolutionary Wars, writing his memoirs (Memoires militaires de Louis de Berton des Balbes de Quiers), published in 1791. He took no part in the War of the Pyrenees (1793–95) between Spain and revolutionary France, but played a significant role in agreeing the peace that terminated the conflict. He died in Madrid in June 1796.

== Reputation and family life ==
The courtesy and chivalry of Crillon attracted much admiration during his lifetime and afterwards. As the English anecdotist William Seward put it in 1798, "Courtesy, no less than courage, was always the appenage of the family of Crillon". During the siege of Gibraltar, he sent his English opponent General George Eliott a gift of fruits, vegetables and game, along with some ice, which he presumed "will not be disagreeable in the excessive heat of this climate at this season of the year." He expressed his "pleasure to which I look forward of becoming your friend, after I shall have learned to render myself worthy of the honour, by facing you as an enemy." Five years later, when his old adversary Eliott was promoted to the peerage and became Lord Heathfield, Crillon wrote to his "dear and respectable enemy", whom he now considered a friend, to offer his congratulations.

Crillon married three times and had four children. His first wife, whom he married on 1 February 1742, was Françoise-Marie-Elizabeth Couvay, with whom he had two children: Louis-Alexandre-Nolasque-Félix de Balbe Berton, who became the 3rd Duke of Crillon on his father's death and had a distinguished military career in his own right; and François-Félix Dorothée. His second wife, whom he married on 2 August 1764, was Florence-Radagonde-Louise-Eléonore-Julie Bruneau de la Rabatelière, who died without issue. His third wife, Josephe-Anathase-Roman-Garmon Espinosa de los Monteros, bore him two more children: Louis-Antoine-François de Paule, who became the 2nd Duke of Mahon, and Marie-Thérèse-Virginie-Françoise de Paul.

== Bibliography ==
- de Courcelles, Jean Baptiste Pierre Jullien (1820). Dictionnaire historique et biographique des généraux français, vol. 1. Paris: Arthus Bertrand.
- Dictionnaire biographique et historique des hommes marquans de la fin du dix-huitieme siecle et plus particulerement de ceux qui ont figure dans la Revolution francoise. Suivi d'un supplement et de 4 tableaux des massacres et proscriptions. Redige par une societe de gens des lettres. Londres [s.n.]: A-D. 1800.
- Drinkwater, John (1786). A History of the Late Siege of Gibraltar. London. OCLC 631054.
- Gorton, John (1826). A General Biographical Dictionary: Containing a Summary Account of the Lives of Eminent Persons of All Nations, Volume 1. London: Hunt & Clarke.
- de Saint-Allais, Nicolas Viton (1817). Nobiliaire universel de France ou recueil général des généalogies historiques des maisons nobles de ce royaume, vol. 10. Paris: Nicolas Viton de Saint-Allais.
- Seward, William (1798). Anecdotes of Distinguished Persons: Chiefly of the Present and Two Preceding Centuries. London: T. Cadell Jun & W. Davies.
- Showalter, Dennis E. (2012). Frederick the Great: A Military History. Frontline Books.
- Wilkes, John (1810). Encyclopaedia Londinensis, Volume 5. London: J. Adlard.
