= Dépôt de la Guerre =

The Dépôt de la Guerre was France's military archive and cartography department, set up in 1688 under Louis XIV and expanded during the French Revolutionary Wars and the Napoleonic Wars.

== History ==
Established by François Michel Le Tellier de Louvois, it was put in charge of gathering, conserving, engraving and publishing historical archives, military memoirs, maps and plans and all topographic activity. In the 18th century lieutenant-general Vault played a notable part in the Dépôt's work.

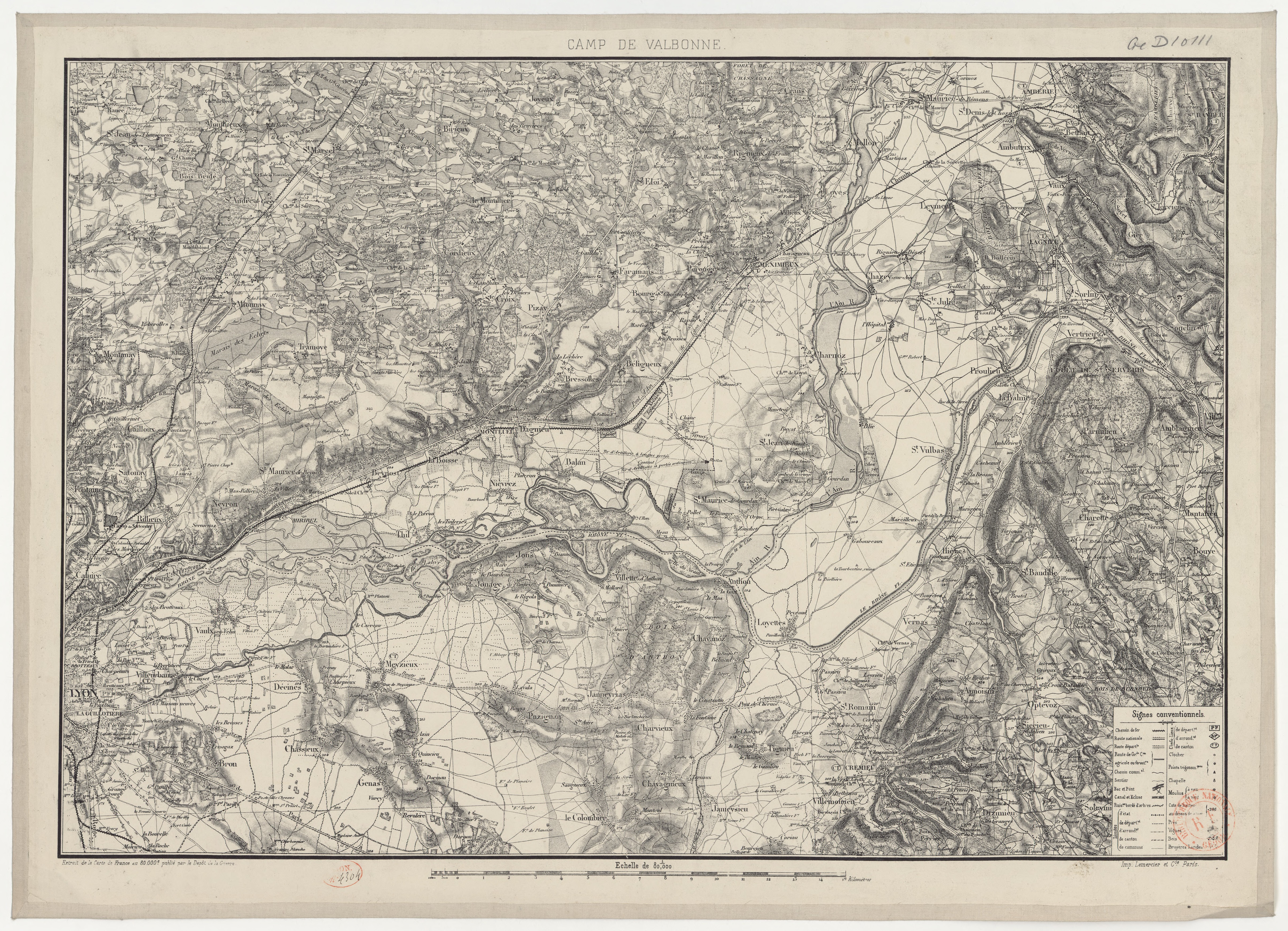
Map of the Camp de la Valbonne, in Ain, made in 1873 by the Dépôt de la Guerre.

Map of 1866, scale 1/40,000, Haute-Savoie department, near Chamonix, in very high resolution

Effectively dissolved during the early years of the French Revolution thanks to a decision by the Constituent Assembly to suppress the military geographical-engineers corps, it was reestablished by Étienne Nicolas de Calon between April 1793 and May 1797, under the new name Dépôt général de la Guerre et de la Géographie (in full, Dépôt général de la Guerre de terre et de mer et de la Géographie) - this underlined the military importance of creating maps and keeping them up to date. However, the staff provided for it were insufficient for its initial ambitions - a large part of its personnel shifted to the Bureau des longitudes and the Service hydrologique de la Marine.

Pierre Dupont de l'Étang was briefly put in charge of the Dépôt from May to September 1797, followed by Jean Ernouf from September 1797 to October 1798 and Hugues Alexandre Joseph Meunier until December 1799. Under the First French Empire it was headed by Henri Jacques Guillaume Clarke from December 1799 to September 1800, Antoine François Andréossy from August 1802 to May 1803, Nicolas Antoine Sanson from June 1803 to June 1805. It flourished during this period, employing 90 geographical engineers and a huge archive of documents, mapping the Cisalpine Republic, Liguria and the newly-annexed Cisrhenian Republic among others. The corps of engineer geographers was definitively recreated in January 1909.

The Dépôt was restructured in 1814, and again in 1823. In 1887, it was split into two separate organisations:

- The Service géographique de l'armée (SGA, "Army Geographic Service"), which in 1940 became the Institut national de l'information géographique et forestière (IGN, "National Institute of Geographic and Forestry Information")
- The Service historique de l'armée (SHA, "Army Historical Service"), later the Service historique de l'armée de terre (SHAT, "Land Army Historical Service"), now the Service historique de la défense (SHD, "Defence Historical Service").

The Dépôt's archives can be consulted at the SHD site at the Château de Vincennes.

== Bibliography ==
- (in French) Patrice Ract, Les ingénieurs géographes des camps et armées du roi, de la guerre de Sept Ans à la Révolution (1756-1791) : étude institutionnelle, prosopographique et sociale (thèse de l'École des chartes soutenue en 2002)
- Fulton, Robert (April 2017). "Crafting a Site of State Information Management: The French Case of the Dépôt de la Guerre". French Historical Studies. 40 (2): 215–240. doi:10.1215/00161071-3761595.
