= François-Louis de Saillans =

French general under the Ancien Regime

François-Louis de Saillans (French pronunciation: [fʁɑ̃swa lwi də sajɑ̃]; 30 October 1741 – 12 July 1792) was a French general under the Ancien Regime.

== Life ==
=== Early life ===
The de Saillans coat of arms

The parish registers mention his birth at the family château d'Ecordal in Herbigny in the Ardennes as follows:

Year of grace 1741, 30 October, I, Jean Cousin, priest, parish priest of Justine and Herbigny, the undersigned, baptised the son of milord Pierre de Saillans, squire, lord of part of Herbigny, residing there, and of Marguerite de Beuvry his wife, married together, to whom was given the name François-Louis. The godfather [was] milord François-Louis de Canelle, lord of part of Herbigny, residing there, sous-brigadier in the Gardes du Corps du Roy; and the godmother [was] Madame Marie-Claire du Guet, wife of milord de Bournonville, with us undersigned.

The family home, corps de logis and square tower can still be seen in the village of Justine-Herbigny.

His father's family was one of the oldest in the Ardennes, raised to the nobility in December 1668 by Caumartin, intendant of the province of Champagne. It originated in Provence, Picardy and Champagne and was only in Herbigny from 1660 to 1770. His mother's family, the de Beuvrys, were linked to the de Parthenays, Hénin-Liétard, the princes de Chimay and through them the Beauvau-Craon, ducs d'Arenberg, princes de Ligne. The families' origins were validated by proofs of nobility presented to Louis-Pierre d'Hozier, juge d'armes de France, on 9 July 1749.

=== Early military career ===
He became a page to Louis XV in Paris, where he was a protégé of the king's daughters. He joined the army aged sixteen on 15 February 1757, as a volunteer in the Bouillon infantry regiment (a German regiment in the French Army, raised in 1757), in which he remained until 8 March 1759. On 1 April 1759 he rose to a cavalry cornet in the Régiment du Hainaut, then an infantry lieutenant in the same unit on 1 January 1760. In 1765 the king's daughters granted him a pension so he could attend the royal artillery school in La Fère, Aisne, renowned for the quality of its teaching. The Duc de Choiseul wrote him a letter of introduction to M de Saint-Auban, maréchal de camp, commander of a brigade in the corps royal:

The king has come, Monsieur, to the decision that he is to grant the chevalier de Saillans (who has the honour of being the protégé of the king's daughters) a place as a student at the ancient school of the royal artillery at La Fère. You are to receive him as such when he presents this letter.

On 11 December 1768 he was made a sous-aide major d'infanterie and sent to Corsica. He was reassigned by a royal ordnance on 1 March 1771 but even so continued to act as a sous-aide major. In a letter of 17 April 1771 Louis XV kept him in that role in recognition of his services. Later in 1771 he was made a captain in the garrison of Lorraine and on 25 July that year he left France as a captain in the force commanded by the baron de Viomesnil and M. de Choisy, sent to support the Bar Confederation in its revolt against Stanisław August Poniatowski and Russia. He captured Kraków Castle on 2 February 1772 and then defended it against attempts to re-take it. The capture was the subject of a pamphlet and made Choisy comment "I give you all my glory, my dear Saillans.". However, the Russian forces eventually proved too much for the Confederation, which had to surrender, leading to the First Partition of Poland between Russia, Austria and Prussia. After the Partition, Saillans remained in Russia as a prisoner of war until August 1773, though he was granted the cross of the Order of Saint Louis on 1 June 1772.

=== Marriage ===
On his return to France he was made a gentleman of the privy chamber of the king's brother on 21 July 1782, a post he held until the French Revolution. It was in that role that he met baron Jules-David de Cromot du Bourg, who had just been made Surintendant des finances chargé des maisons, domaines et finances to Louis-Stanislas, comte de Provence (the future Louis XVIII). Du Bourg presented his niece Françoise de Cromot to Saillans and witnessed their marriage, which made Saillans lord of Vassy and La Vaire, two de Cromot estates near Avallon previously owned by his new wife. Before the Revolution, Saillans moved from garrison to garrison, residing at Épinal, Huningue, Sedan, Vienne, Pont-Saint-Esprit, Largentière and Alès.

=== Revolution ===
He was made a major of the Roussillon chasseur battalion on 1 May 1788 and in November 1791 he was in Perpignan as lieutenant-colonel of the same battalion. He and most of the officers in the Perpignan garrison were opposed to the Revolution. On the night of 6–7 December 1791 he and a hundred other officers chose general Chollet, commander of the Perpignan garrison, to head a royalist conspiracy, but Chollet was denounced, arrested, taken to the Palace of Versailles and there killed on the steps of the Orangerie. An arrest warrant was also issued for Saillans and so he set off for Koblenz, where he joined the Armée des émigrés.

Saillans played a major part in the third 'camp de Jalès', which aimed to raise almost one-quarter of France in rebellion, namely the south-east, which from Marseille onwards was very royalist and had a pronounced Catholicism due to its persecution of Protestants. La Rouërie in the west was already in revolt, so first it had to capture Puy-en-Velay so as to open up the Massif central, which was ready to revolt. His second objective was Lyon, also a royalist stronghold. Once these objectives were completed, the armies of Condé and Victor Amadeus III of Sardinia (brother-in-law of the comte d'Artois) would have to come in to reinforce him and extend the conflict into eastern France, whilst other forces would simultaneously cross from the German side of the Rhine to join up with them.

After two initial committees were beaten, Claude Allier, friend of the Comité de Jalès, stated that more than 20,000 men were ready to fight for the royalist cause in Vivarais and were only awaiting the appointment of a man capable of leading them. The princes thus appointed the Irishman Thomas Conway as its supreme commander, with Saillans as his second in command. However, Conway was not keen on the expedition and delayed his journey to France, hoping he would be removed from office - Saillans thus effectively took over as its de facto supreme commander and was reprimanded by the princes:

Sir, we were surprised when an officer arrived here, sent by you, without orders and even without permission from the count of Conway. You have forgotten that the post of supreme commander you have assumed may be granted only by the King's authority [and] that we do not wish to receive news of any plans except his and that you must obey his orders in all cases.

Impatient to begin and remembering Allier's promise of 20,000 ready to rise in revolt, Saissans refused to await orders from the princes and Conway and decided with chevalier Isidore de Melon and Joseph Marie Chabalier, to launch the revolt by attacking the château de Banne on 4 July 1792. Its garrison quickly surrendered and Saillans found himself master of the plain and of the surrounding parishes, with 1200 men under his command. However, this provoked the nearby Republican troops to pursue Saillans and his force and the revolt was suppressed by troops from Gard and Ardèche on 11 July, leaving Saillans' men massacred and the villages of Saint-André-de-Cruzières and Jalès burned to the ground. Saillans held the castle but otherwise was driven back.

=== Flight and death ===
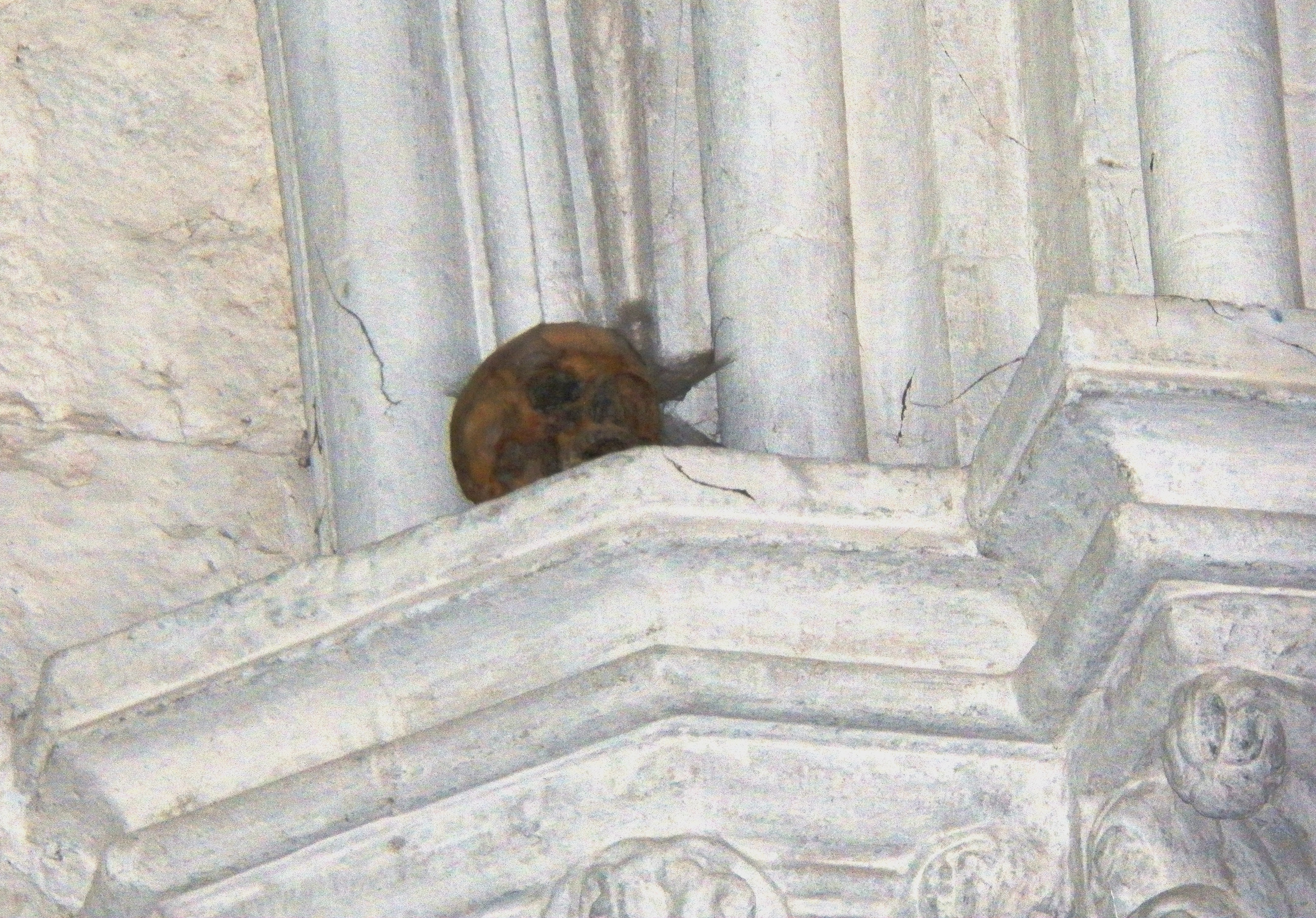
Saillans' skull in the église Notre-Dame-des-Pommiers in Largentière.

Saillans tried to flee into Lozère dressed as a peasant, heading for Elze (now in the commune of Malons), where he stayed a night in a partisan's house. He was accompanied by an old man called Nadal, his valet and two priests, abbé Pradon, parish priest of Bannes and abbé Boissin, parish priest of Puech. At 7 am on 12 July the five men set off towards Villefort, but near the hamlet of Aidons they met a National Guard patrol commanded by Laurent, formerly a non-commissioned officer in the régiment de Hainaut.

They were arrested, taken to Laurent's house and interrogated. Saillans tried to pass himself off as the parish priest of Barjac and quickly tried to get rid of his papers in a nearby stable. However, Laurent spotted him, seized the papers and told Saillans that he recognised him. In his Conspirations royalistes du midi sous la Révolution, Ernest Daudet states that Saillans did not deny it and told Laurent "I'm in your hands, here is my cross, free me and wish me good luck in my enterprise and I'll give you fifty louis". Laurent refused and Saillans tried to strangle him, crying "If it was just you and me, without your comrades, I'd make you do what I want". Laurent threw him off and summoned his soldiers. The prisoners were sent to Les Vans and cut down with sabres in place de la Grave without trial - a cross still marks the site. His body was buried in a common grave at Les Vans, whilst a man from Largentière called La Paille took Saillans' head back to Largentière on a pike - it was buried there in a common grave on the river bank, where it was rediscovered in 1894 whilst digging the foundations for a house and taken to the village church, where the skull can still be seen atop a capital.

Saillans had not seen his 47-year-old wife Françoise since he set off on his Ardéche expedition - she died later at Tour Gaffey in Avallon (where Saillans' mother, aunt and daughter also died). Their second child was Julie (7 April 1783, Avallon - 11 July 1857, near Avallon), whose godfather was Jules-David de Cromot. On 11 firmaire, year IV (1805), Julie married Michel-Auguste Guillier de Monts, from an old Nivernais family - he too was then living in Avallon and later became mayor of Annéot. He and Julie had three children - Charles, Ernest and Léonie - before she died in 1857 in the small château d'Annéot near Avallon. Léonie went on to marry Victor-Philippe Goupilleau.

== Bibliography (in French) ==
- Chanoine Patriat, Notice sur le comte de Saillans, 1741-1792
- Abbé Jean Guiraud, Notes sur le village d'Herbigny (Ardennes). Le Cte François-Louis de Saillans (1741-1792), 1911
- Revue de la Révolution, vol. 7, p. 294-299, 1866.
- Jean Baptiste Pierre Jullien de Courcelles, Dictionnaire universel de la noblesse de France, au bureau général de la noblesse, Paris, 1821, p. 144.
