= Charles-Gustave de Falkenhayn =

18th-century French general

Charles-Gustave de Falkenhayn (14 July 1724 – 1793 or later) was a French general of German ancestry.

He became a colonel in the Regiment Royal-Pologne in 1754 and commanded the Regiment de Baviere from 1762. He was promoted to brigadier in 1762 and marechal de camp in 1770. He was second-in-command of the Franco-Spanish Invasion of Minorca in 1781 and also came into contact with Benjamin Franklin in 1783.
