= Invasion of Minorca (1781) =

1781 invasion of the American Revolutionary War

- Part of the American Revolutionary War
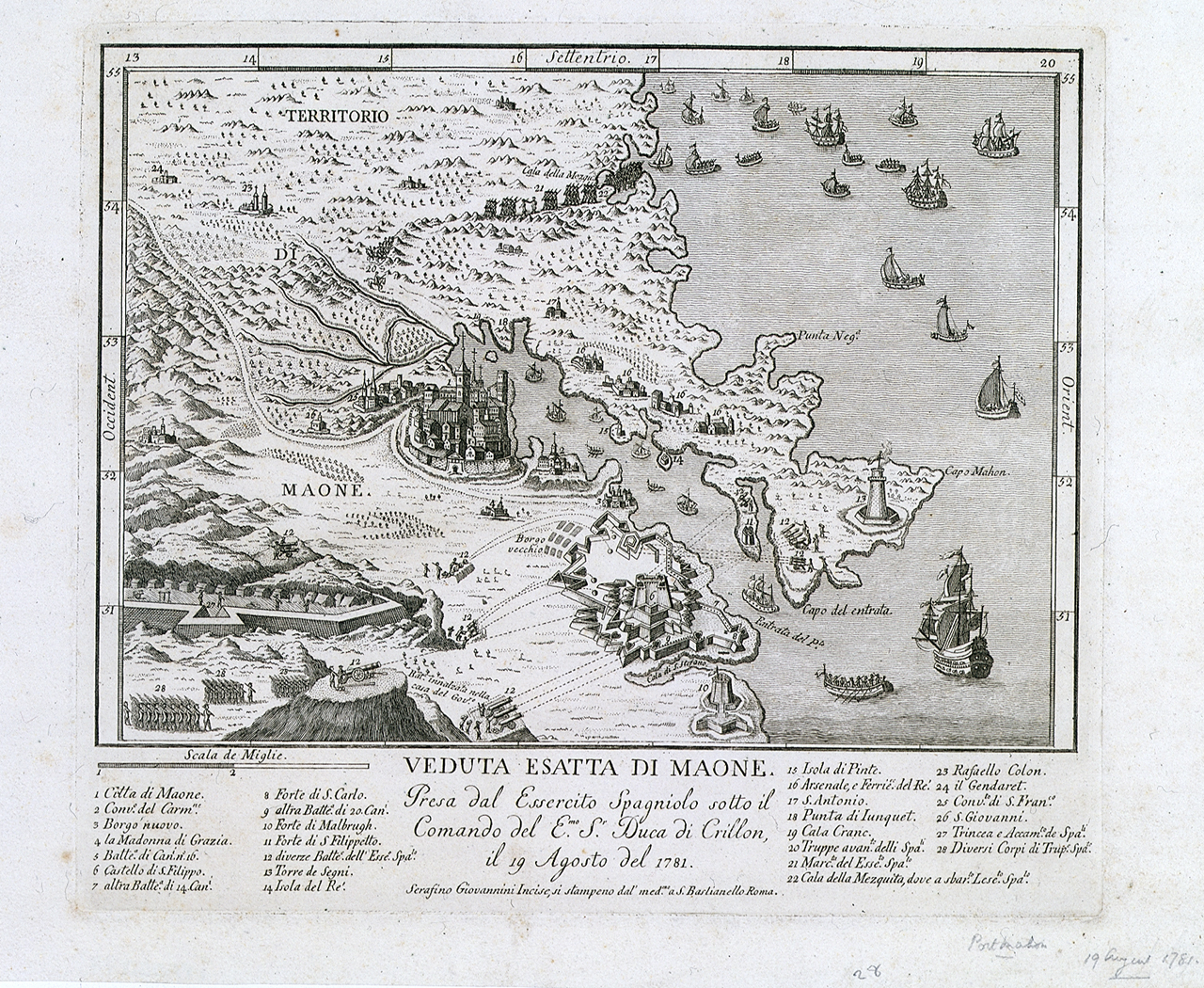
- 1781 engraving of the invasion
Date	19 August 1781 – 5 February 1782 (5 months, 2 weeks and 3 days)
Location	Minorca, Mediterranean Sea
Result	Franco-Spanish victory

Belligerents
Spain; France	Great Britain; Hanover

Commanders and leaders
(Spain) Duke of Crillon	(Kingdom of Great Britain) James Murray (surrendered)

Strength
14,000	3,000

Casualties and losses
184 killed 380 wounded	59 killed 149 wounded 2,481 captured

The Franco-Spanish reconquest of Minorca from the British in February 1782, after the siege of Fort St. Philip lasting over five months, was an important step in the achievement of Spain's aims in its alliance with France against Britain during the American Revolutionary War. The ultimate result was the devolution of the island to Spain in the Treaty of Paris in 1783.

== Background ==
At the eastern end of the island of Minorca is the port of Mahón, one of the best deep-water anchorages in the Mediterranean Sea. For a naval power with no Mediterranean coast, possession of Minorca, therefore, was of major strategic advantage, and for most of the 18th century, Minorca was under British control. The narrow entrance to the port was guarded by a fort, known to the British as St. Philip's Castle, a translation of the original Spanish, el castillo de San Felipe, which (with two outlying fortlets, San Carlos and Marlborough) was massively strengthened after the events of 1756, when Admiral John Byng judged the safety of his fleet more important than the possession of the fort, and was subsequently shot to encourage other admirals to take a more positive view of their duties. Although the French won that battle, they lost the Seven Years' War in 1763, and so Minorca was returned to Britain rather than France's ally Spain, to which the island was historically tied. The Spanish government renewed its alliance with France against Britain by means of the Treaty of Aranjuez (12 April 1779), with the recapture of Minorca as one of its main aims. Although secondary to the recapture of Gibraltar, Britain's other Mediterranean sea-fortress, removing Minorca from British control was important because it was home to a large amount of privateers licensed by the governor of Minorca, Lieutenant-general James Murray.

== Prelude ==
=== Plans for reconquest ===
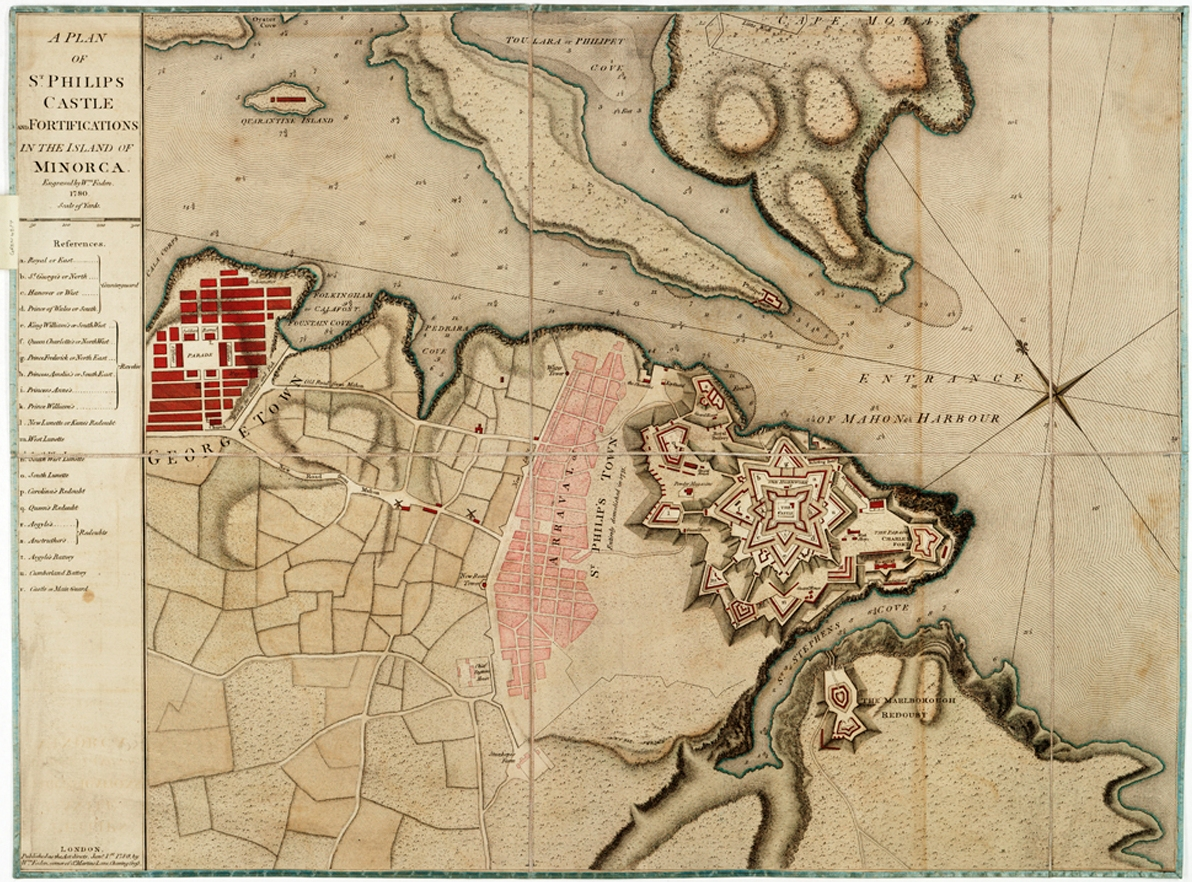
Plan of Fort St. Philip. (1780)

The attempt at recapturing Gibraltar in 1779 led to a protracted siege, and by the end of 1780, Spain's military leaders were accepting that they would have to embark on some of their other projects in parallel with the siege there. An invasion of Minorca was therefore planned during the first few months of 1781, largely by Louis des Balbes de Berton de Crillon. In theory, he was working with Spain's War Ministers, and Foreign Minister José Moñino y Redondo, conde de Floridablanca; in practice, the relationship between the two men seems to have been somewhat strained, and de Crillon perhaps did not take as much advice as he should have.

=== Invasion fleet ===
On 25 June 1781, a French force of about 20 warships, commanded by Admiral Guichen, left Brest on a coastal patrol, which happened to involve sailing into the Mediterranean. They were going to provide additional protection for the invasion fleet, but, in order to fool the British, they would not be joining their Spanish allies until they were close to the target. The Spanish invasion fleet (51 troop carriers, 18 supply vessels, 3 hospital ships, 3 "viveres", 2 bombardment ships, a fireship, and 13 armed escorts), departed Cádiz on 23 July 1781, initially heading westward to appear as if its destination was America, but turned in the night and passed Gibraltar on 25 July. Facing contrary winds in the Mediterranean, by 29 July the convoy was beginning to break up, and was forced to take shelter at La Subida cove, near Cartagena. At some time over the next few days the Spanish were discreetly joined by the French warships. The combined fleet left La Subida on 5 August, came within sight of Alicante on 14 August, then in the night of 17 August headed away from the Spanish coast and sailed parallel to Formentera. On 18 August, as it passed the little island of Cabrera, south of Mallorca, the fleet was joined by another 4 warships, from Palma. That night, the wind blew from the south-east, and the fleet had to take precautions to avoid being blown aground on Mallorca, but Minorca was sighted the next morning.

=== Invasion plan ===
A main force was to be landed at Mesquida bay, just north of the main target, Port Mahón, and a secondary force at Alcaufar bay, south of the port, while the other two significant harbours on the island, at Ciudadela and Fornells, were to be blockaded. The Mesquida force was to move rapidly to the town of Mahón, where the Governor lived, to capture him and as many British soldiers as possible. The Alcaufar force was to block the road that led from the British residential suburb, Georgetown (now Es Castell), to the fort of St. Philip's Castle. At about the same time, a third force was to land on Degollador beach at Ciudadela, to block the main road across the island. Finally, a detachment would be landed at Fornells, to take the small artillery fort there.

=== Invasion reality ===
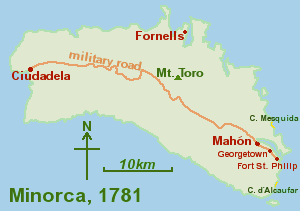

This plan had one basic flaw – the assumption that the British would believe a vast convoy approaching Minorca had friendly intentions. Additionally, further modifications had to be made because of the wind, which forced the main part of the fleet to sail round the south of the island, rather than the north; the landing at Ciudadela was also temporarily impossible. So, about 10:30 am, the fleet rounded Aire island, at the south-east tip of Minorca, and began the approach to Port Mahón, while the Alcaufar contingent headed for land. A little after 11:30, the leading vessel of the fleet, San Pascual passed St. Philip's Castle, its crew at battle stations (immediate battle was not anticipated, but this was a naval tradition). Finally, around 1:00 pm, San Pascual arrived at Mesquida, and the rest of the fleet gradually caught up, and preparations for landing began. At 6:00 pm, the Spanish flag was raised on the beach, and received a 23-gun salute.

The British had a watchtower on the south coast of Minorca, and had spotted the fleet approaching. An urgent message was immediately sent to Mahón; later reinforced by a more detailed report from the watchtower on Monte Toro, in the centre of the island. By midday, most of the British personnel around Mahón had been moved within the walls of St. Philip's Castle, a chain had been fixed across the entrance to the port, and small vessels were being sunk in the narrow channel, making entry by sea impossible. Some dependants, including the Governor's family, made preparations to sail to safety in Italy aboard a Venetian ship, and a message about the invasion was sent to the British envoy at Florence, ending with an assurance that the garrison was in "high health and Spirits" and would make "a vigorous resistance". The ship reached Leghorn – Livorno in Italian – on 31 August). When the Spanish troops entered the town of Mahón, most of the remaining population was on their side, and greeted them with cheers. At Georgetown only 152 prisoners were taken, and the troops sent to Ciudadela and Fornells on 20 August found only token British forces of about 50 men. While arrangements were made to put the island under a Spanish administration, letters were exchanged between de Crillon and Governor Murray, and the invaders began preparing their own defences against counter-attacks. By 23 August there were over 7,000 Spanish soldiers on Minorca, and 3,000 more soon joined them. The bulk of the fleet left once the troops were securely established, and Guichen arrived back at Brest on 15 September.

When news of the invasion got back to Britain about four weeks later, newspapers reported that the garrison consisted of some 5,660 men. However, of that number, 1,500 were members of the local militia, and 400 were civilian workers. Very few members of those groups actually went into the fort, except for a few members of the international business community the British had welcomed onto Minorca – North Africans, Jews, Greeks, etc. (Incidentally, the invaders expelled the remainder of the African and Jewish communities on 11 September, and various other foreign nationals shortly afterwards). Also, the number of soldiers included those captured elsewhere on the island by the invaders, so the real total of fighting men in the fort would be closer to 3,000 – and it seems that even that was an exaggeration to discourage the invaders.

== Battle ==
=== Siege begins ===
St. Philip's Castle and the surrounding siegeworks

Work soon began on gun emplacements to besiege St. Philip's Castle, the most important being at La Mola, on the opposite side of the harbour mouth, and at Binisaida, near Georgetown. The British did not make this easy; they directed their own guns at the work sites, and also occasionally sent troops out of the fort. The most notable of these sallies took place on 11 October, when between 400 and (as the Spanish newspapers had it) 700 soldiers crossed the harbour to La Mola, and captured eighty soldiers with eight officers. Spanish troops were sent in pursuit, but too late; the officers were later freed after giving their word of honour that they would not enter combat again unless exchanged for captured British officers. Three British soldiers were killed in the action. Although this action was a success for the British, relations between Murray and his deputy, Lieutenant General Sir William Draper, were becoming strained by this time, due to arguments over their respective areas of authority and would later deteriorate much further.

Even before this, there was considerable discontent among de Crillon's troops, comparisons being made with the futile Spanish attack on the city of Argel (Algiers) in 1775. Reinforcements had therefore been ordered, and by coincidence, the first boatload arrived at Fornells from Marseilles the day after the British attack. By 23 October two brigades (one French and one German) totalling 3,886 men had been added to the 10,411 already on the island. Also at this time, de Crillon was requested by the Spanish government to attempt an alternative strategy. Among the rather confused reports which filtered through to Britain from Minorca, delayed by several months, were two letters published in the London papers at the end of January 1782. One is from Murray to de Crillon, dated 16 October 1781, sharply reminding him that the Murray family tree is as noble as the Duc's, and that when a former Duc de Crillon was asked by his King to betray his honour, he refused. The other is de Crillon's reply, indicating that he personally is happy to accept Murray's criticism. The source of this exchange was an offer to the governor of 500,000 pesos (then worth just over £100,000 – but inflated in some sources to £1,000,000) plus a guaranteed rank in the Spanish or French army, in return for surrender.

=== Great bombardment ===
On 11 November the besiegers' mortar batteries began operation. In the first couple of days the only item damaged within the Castle was the carriage of a small 6-pound gun. One mortar battery was destroyed when a shell fired from the Castle blew up its powder magazine. The Castle gunners also succeeded in sinking a supply vessel attempting to unload at the Georgetown quay. This information was reported in two letters from General Murray, dated 12 and 13 November, which somehow got back to England by 4 December. Letters were also being sent from the British government to Murray, praising the bravery of the garrison and promising help as soon as possible. In practice, with Gibraltar also under siege, the British were relying on the elaborate improvements which had been made at St. Philip's Castle after the 1756 embarrassment – which included the provision of food for over a year.

After nearly two months spent weakening the fort with artillery, 6 January 1782 was the date set for the beginning of a final assault. In the first days of this attack, intensified bombardments from 100 cannons and 35 mortars did such damage to the outer defences that Murray had to pull all his troops back within the inner citadel. However, when firing slackened the defenders would begin their own bombardments of the attackers' positions, with over 200 cannons and 40 mortars – they also sank another supply vessel on 12 January. Three days later the attackers got their revenge, setting fire with a well-aimed incendiary grenade to a key storehouse, containing, among other things, much of the fort's supply of salted meat, which burned for four days. About this time, also, the relationship between Governor Murray and Lieutenant-Governor Draper broke down completely, and after an unpleasant incident the latter was suspended from duty.

=== British defeat ===
To the garrison, the loss of meat was a relatively minor problem. The improvements at the fort had not included artillery-resistant vegetable gardens, so the occupants had no access to fresh vegetables, the most reliable medicine to combat the disease scurvy, now known to be caused by vitamin deficiency. Gradually, more and more of the soldiers showed serious symptoms, and at the beginning of February the number in hospital was growing by more than 50 per day. To keep watch at all points of the complex defences, 415 men were required. With only 660 men able to perform any duties at all by 3 February, the garrison was therefore 170 men short of the 830 necessary to maintain two shifts of guards in a day. Of those 660 men, 560 showed symptoms of scurvy, and several men died while on sentry duty, having chosen not to report their condition to the medical officers.

Following a series of urgent reports by his medical team, on 4 February 1782 General Murray sent a list of ten surrender terms to the Duc de Crillon, based on the principle that the garrison should be provided with transport back to Britain, which would be paid for by the British government. These had to be rejected, as de Crillon had been instructed to insist on the garrison being declared prisoners of war, but he hinted strongly that a compromise should be possible. The final agreement, accepted by both sides on 5 February and signed on 6 February, allowed the men to become temporary prisoners of war while they waited for the transport ships, and even stipulated that "in Consideration of the Constancy and Valour which General Murray and his Men have shewn in their brave Defence, they shall be permitted to go out with their Arms shouldered, Drums beating, lighted Matches, and Colours flying, till having marched through the Midst of the Army, they shall lay down their Arms and Colours". Thus the 950 or so who could walk duly did, the ranks of Spanish and French troops stretching all the way along both sides of the road from St. Philip's Castle to Georgetown, where the defenders laid down their arms in surrender "to God alone". Though he looked straight ahead as he marched, Murray was informed by de Crillon and his deputy the Baron de Falkenhayn that many of the French and Spanish wept at what they saw. In some respects, De Crillon and his subordinates went far beyond the agreement, and Murray noted that they provided "every Thing which can contribute to our Recovery".

== Aftermath ==
The Gaceta de Madrid estimates of Spanish casualties (22 February 1782) were 184 killed and 380 wounded. According to The London Gazette report of the end of the siege, 59 of the British garrison were killed. This left 2,481 military personnel, including 149 wounded, to surrender, suggesting either that a large number of deaths from scurvy were ignored, or that the earlier British claims about the size of the garrison were significantly exaggerated. Also emerging from the fort after the surrender were 43 civilian workers, 154 wives, and 212 children. The castle itself, after some discussion among Spanish military planners, was later damaged beyond easy repair, so that it could not be seized in the sort of surprise attack de Crillon had intended, and used against the Spanish.

Following his success, the Duc de Crillon was awarded the title "duque de Mahón" and put in charge of the attempt to recapture Gibraltar, which ended in a Franco-Spanish defeat. Lieutenant General James Murray was court-martialled in November 1782, on charges brought by Sir William Draper. Murray was found guilty of only two offences (the more serious of which was the issuing of an order derogatory to his deputy – the spark which had led to Draper's suspension in January). In January 1783 he was sentenced to a reprimand, and shortly afterwards, by the direct intervention of King George III, he received an apology from Draper for certain words spoken out of court, which might otherwise have led to a duel. In February he was promoted to full General, but having passed his 60th birthday during the siege, he never returned to active service, though he became colonel of the 21st Fusiliers in 1789.

Britain captured Minorca again in 1798 during the French Revolutionary Wars, but returned it permanently to Spain in 1802 following the Treaty of Amiens.

== Principal source ==
- Terrón Ponce, José L. (1981). "La reconquista de Menorca por el duque de Crillon (1781–1782)". Mahón: Museo Militar. Accessed 2007-12-17.

== Further information ==
- Historic maps of the Port Mahon area (click compass roses) mapforum.com – accessed 2007-12-15
- 18th century pictures and more maps, menorcaprints.com – accessed 2007-12-15
- Terrón Ponce, José L. Online versions of various articles (in Spanish) including several related to the 1781-2 siege – accessed 2007-12-17
- Terrón Ponce, José L. La toma de Menorca en las memorias y epistolario del duque de Crillon, Mahón, I.M.E. (1998)- online edition
