= Rives-du-Fougerais =

- Commune
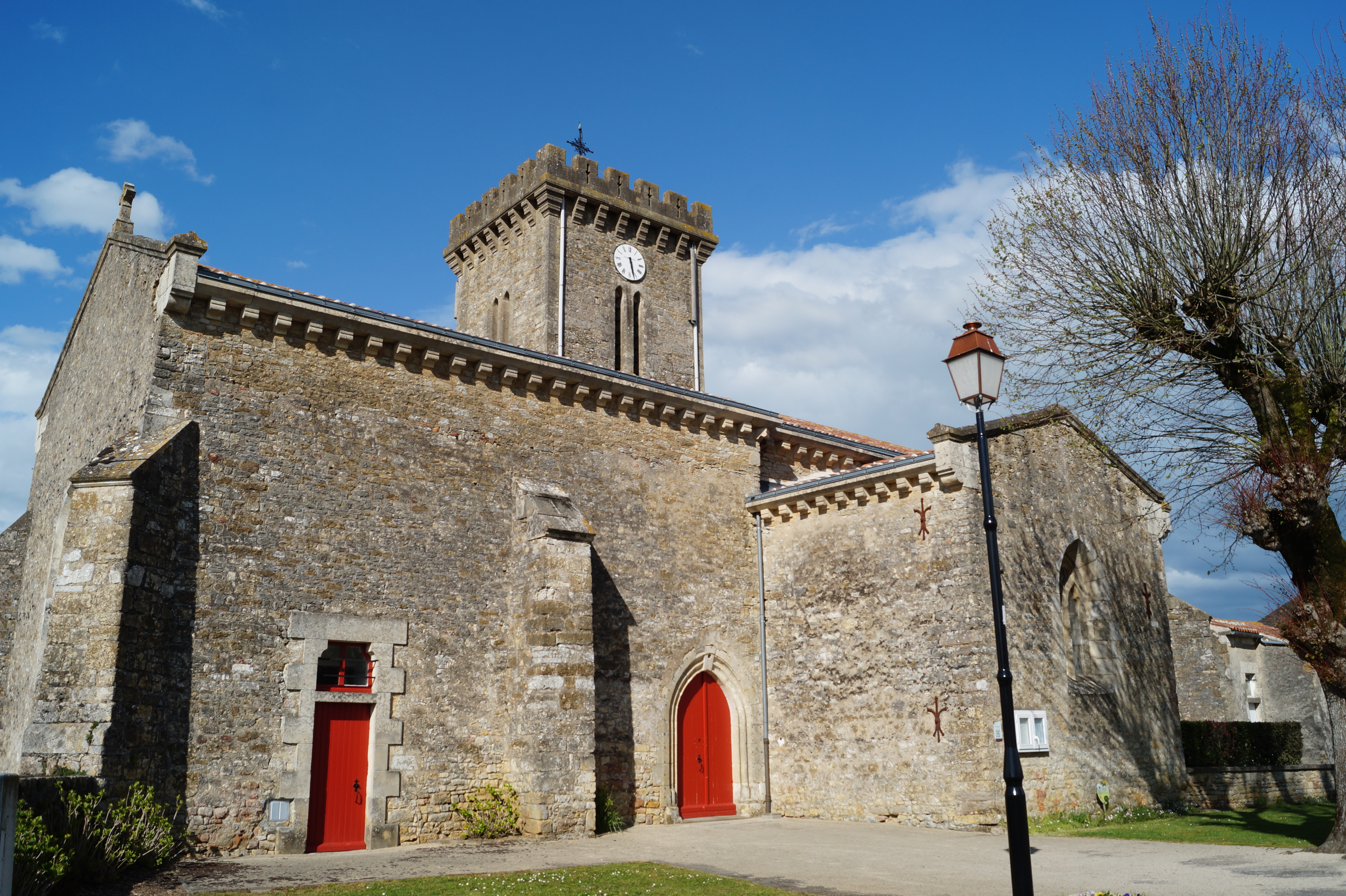
- Location of Rives-du-Fougerais
- Location within France Location within Pays de la Loire
- Coordinates: 46°37′12″N 0°52′45″W
- Country: France
- Region: Pays de la Loire
- Department: Vendée
- Arrondissement: Fontenay-le-Comte
- Canton: La Châtaigneraie
- Intercommunality: Pays de la Châtaigneraie

Government
  - Mayor (2025–2026): Sophie Berger
- Area^{1}: 42.93 km^{2} (16.58 sq mi)
- Highest elevation: 128 m (420 ft)
- Lowest elevation: 51 m (167 ft)
- Population (2023): 1,500
  - Density: 35/km^{2} (90/sq mi)
- Time zone: UTC+01:00 (CET)
  - Summer (DST): UTC+02:00 (CEST)
- INSEE/Postal code: 85292 /85410
- ^{1} French Land Register data, which excludes lakes, ponds, glaciers > 1 km^{2} (0.386 sq mi or 247 acres) and river estuaries.

Rives-du-Fougerais (French pronunciation: [ʁiv dy fuʒʁɛ]) is a commune in the Vendée department in the Pays de la Loire region in western France. It was established on 1 January 2024, with the merger of the communes of Cezais, Saint-Sulpice-en-Pareds and Thouarsais-Bouildroux. Its seat is Thouarsais-Bouildroux.

== Toponymy ==
Rives-du-Fougerais takes its name from the Petit-Fougerais river which has its source in Saint-Sulpice-en-Pareds and crosses the three delegated communes.

== History ==
On 1 January 2024, Cezais, Saint-Sulpice-en-Pareds and Thouarsais-Bouildroux merged to create the new commune of Rives-du-Fougerais.

== Geography ==
The new commune of Rives-du-Fougerais is located to the east of the Vendée department, in the Bocage Vendéen and the small agricultural region of Bas Bocage Vendéen. It is located 43.7 km (27.2 mi) from La Roche-sur-Yon, the prefecture of the department, 17.1 km (10.6 mi) from the sub-prefecture Fontenay-le-Comte, and 10.8 km (6.7 mi) from the La Châtaigneraie, capital of the eponymous canton on which the commune has depended since its creation. Rives-du-Fougerais is also part of the La Châtaigneraie living area. The closest communes are La Caillère-Saint-Hilaire (2.4 km (1.5 mi)), Bazoges-en-Pareds (4.5 km (2.8 mi)), Saint-Maurice-le-Girard (5.4 km (3.4 mi)), Saint-Cyr-des-Gats (5.7 km (3.5 mi)), Saint-Laurent-de-la-Salle (6.7 km (4.2 mi)), Antigny (7.6 km (4.7 mi)), Bourneau (8.3 km (5.2 mi)) and Vouvant (8.4 km (5.2 mi)).

== See also ==
- Communes of the Vendée department
