= Léopold Gelot =

French cyclist

Personal information
- Born: 8 March 1890 Marsais-Sainte-Radégonde, Pays-de-Loire
- Died: 15 December 1980 (aged 90) l'Hermenault, Vendée

Cycling career
- Sport: Cycling
- Discipline: Road
- Role: Rider

Léopold Gelot (8 March 1890 – 15 December 1980) was a French racing cyclist. He rode in the 1924 Tour de France.
