= Saint-Valérien =

Saint-Valérien may refer to:

- Saint-Valérien, Vendée, a commune in the French region of Pays-de-la-Loire
- Saint-Valérien, Yonne, a commune in the French region of Bourgogne
- Saint-Valérien, Quebec, a parish municipality in the province of Québec
- Saint-Valérien-de-Milton, Quebec, a municipality in the province of Québec
