= Faymoreau =

- Commune
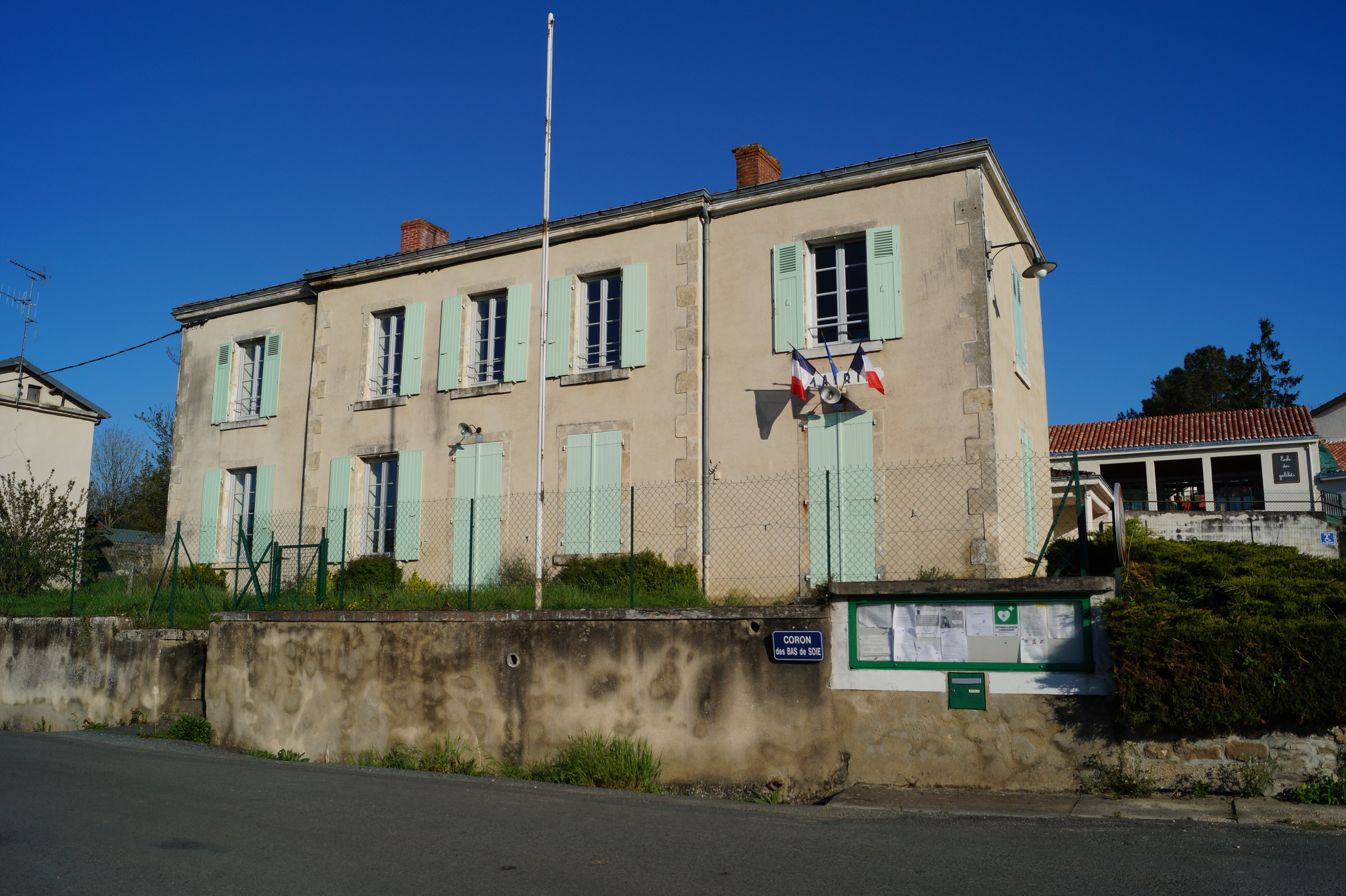

- Coat of arms
- Location of Faymoreau
- Location within France Location within Pays de la Loire
- Coordinates: 46°32′18″N 0°37′38″W
- Country: France
- Region: Pays de la Loire
- Department: Vendée
- Arrondissement: Fontenay-le-Comte
- Canton: Fontenay-le-Comte
- Intercommunality: Vendée Sèvre Autise

Government
  - Mayor (2024–2026): Martial Millet
- Area^{1}: 10.99 km^{2} (4.24 sq mi)
- Highest elevation: 121 m (397 ft)
- Lowest elevation: 54 m (177 ft)
- Population (2023): 209
  - Density: 19.0/km^{2} (49.3/sq mi)
- Time zone: UTC+01:00 (CET)
  - Summer (DST): UTC+02:00 (CEST)
- INSEE/Postal code: 85087 /85240
- ^{1} French Land Register data, which excludes lakes, ponds, glaciers > 1 km^{2} (0.386 sq mi or 247 acres) and river estuaries.

Faymoreau (French pronunciation: [femɔʁo]) is a commune in the Vendée department in the Pays de la Loire region in western France.

== Demography ==
Historical population
Year	Pop.	±% p.a.
1968	451	—
1975	413	−1.25%
1982	343	−2.62%
1990	280	−2.50%
1999	267	−0.53%
2007	242	−1.22%
2012	217	−2.16%
2017	202	−1.42%
2023	209	+0.57%
Source: INSEE

Because of coal mining activities in the 19th century, Faymoreau reached the number of 1,190 inhabitants in 1876. A record accounted for a strong immigration of Polish mineworkers which is explained by the strong activity of the commune at the time. Puy-de-Serre, a neighbouring commune, was, between 1827 and 1883 part of Faymoreau, inflating logically the amount of inhabitants.

== Population pyramid ==
The population of the commune is relatively old, despite the presence of a nursery school. Indeed, 36% of the people are over 60, which is way higher than the national rate (about 21%) and the departemental rate (barely 25%). It is good to know that 52.5% of the inhabitants of the village are women, which fits the national average of 51.6%. In recent years, a young population emerged, and now represents approximately 18% of the commune's population. However, the biggest age bracket is still represented by the men and women between 60 and 74 years old, making up a good quarter of the inhabitants of the commune. Regarding the youth of the village, the nursery school, mentioned earlier, is welcoming an average of 18 pupils per year, with regular ups and downs. Once the nursery school is over for these children, they can continue their education in the neighbouring village Puy de Serre, where a primary school is located. We can note that the nursery school welcomes all children of the group of neighbouring villages, Faymoreau, Puy de Serre and Marillet.

== Places and monuments to visit ==
- The "Mining Centre", "Centre Minier" in French, a location made up of a museum, "Le Musée de La Mine" taking you through the history of the coal mine of Faymoreau.
- The mining village and its chapel (19th century) of which its stained glass windows were rebuilt by Carmelo Zagari as a tribute to the underground workers (it was a public order in 2001).
- The flood barrier, an actual pond were anyone is welcome to fish for a little amount of money.
- "L'Hôtel des Mines", the restaurant of the village which used to be an actual hotel but only remained a restaurant and a bar.
- The market town, the main entrance of the village in some sort, which contains the church of the village, the church of Saint Louis (built in 1883, not to mix up with the chapel though they have been built in the same century), the church of Saint Louis, actually in renovation (of the outward appearance and of the church tower), and this until 2013–14.
- The forests, mostly private properties, can though be crossed, as many campaign roads of the market town pass through them.
- Also, one can rest and spend holidays in the commune as "gîtes" and "chambres d'hôtes" opened in the last decade and are available for rent in the spring and summer months.

== The Mine ==
The Faymoreau mine was a coal mine. Basically, it was a coal deposit discovered by chance in 1827 by a clog-maker. This vein will soon become a real mine, as other lodes were found out, attracting miners from the entire region, but also from different parts of Europe as the mine was offering a lot of job offers. Thus for more than a century, French, Polish and Italian miners will cohabit in the mine and live split-up in the mining village. This mine will be the main economic interest of the village, until its closing in 1958. Nowadays, the museum of the mine relates its story, describing its growth, its special events and accidents and its fall, but also the miners' condition at work.

== See also ==
- Communes of the Vendée department
