= Cezais =

- Part of Rives-du-Fougerais
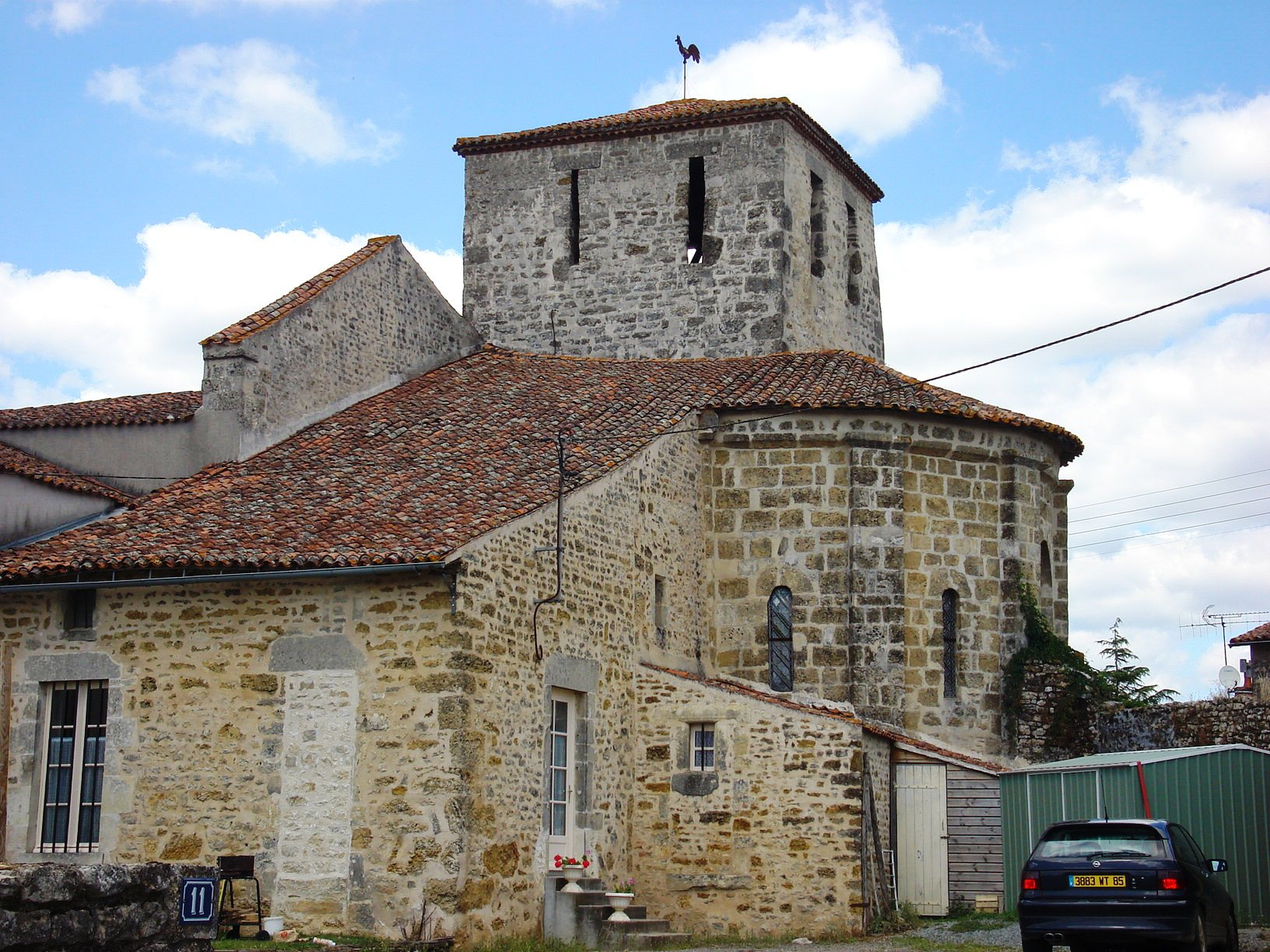
- The church of Saint-Hilaire, in Cezais
- Location of Cezais
- Location within France Location within Pays de la Loire
- Coordinates: 46°35′25″N 0°49′03″W
- Country: France
- Region: Pays de la Loire
- Department: Vendée
- Arrondissement: Fontenay-le-Comte
- Canton: La Châtaigneraie
- Commune: Rives-du-Fougerais
- Area^{1}: 12.22 km^{2} (4.72 sq mi)
- Highest elevation: 118 m (387 ft)
- Lowest elevation: 51 m (167 ft)
- Population (2021): 297
  - Density: 24.3/km^{2} (62.9/sq mi)
- Time zone: UTC+01:00 (CET)
  - Summer (DST): UTC+02:00 (CEST)
- Postal code: 85410
- ^{1} French Land Register data, which excludes lakes, ponds, glaciers > 1 km^{2} (0.386 sq mi or 247 acres) and river estuaries.

Cezais (French pronunciation: [səzɛ]) is a former commune in the Vendée department in the Pays de la Loire region in western France. On 1 January 2024, it was merged into the new commune of Rives-du-Fougerais.

== See also ==
- Communes of the Vendée department
