= Thouarsais-Bouildroux =

- Part of Rives-du-Fougerais
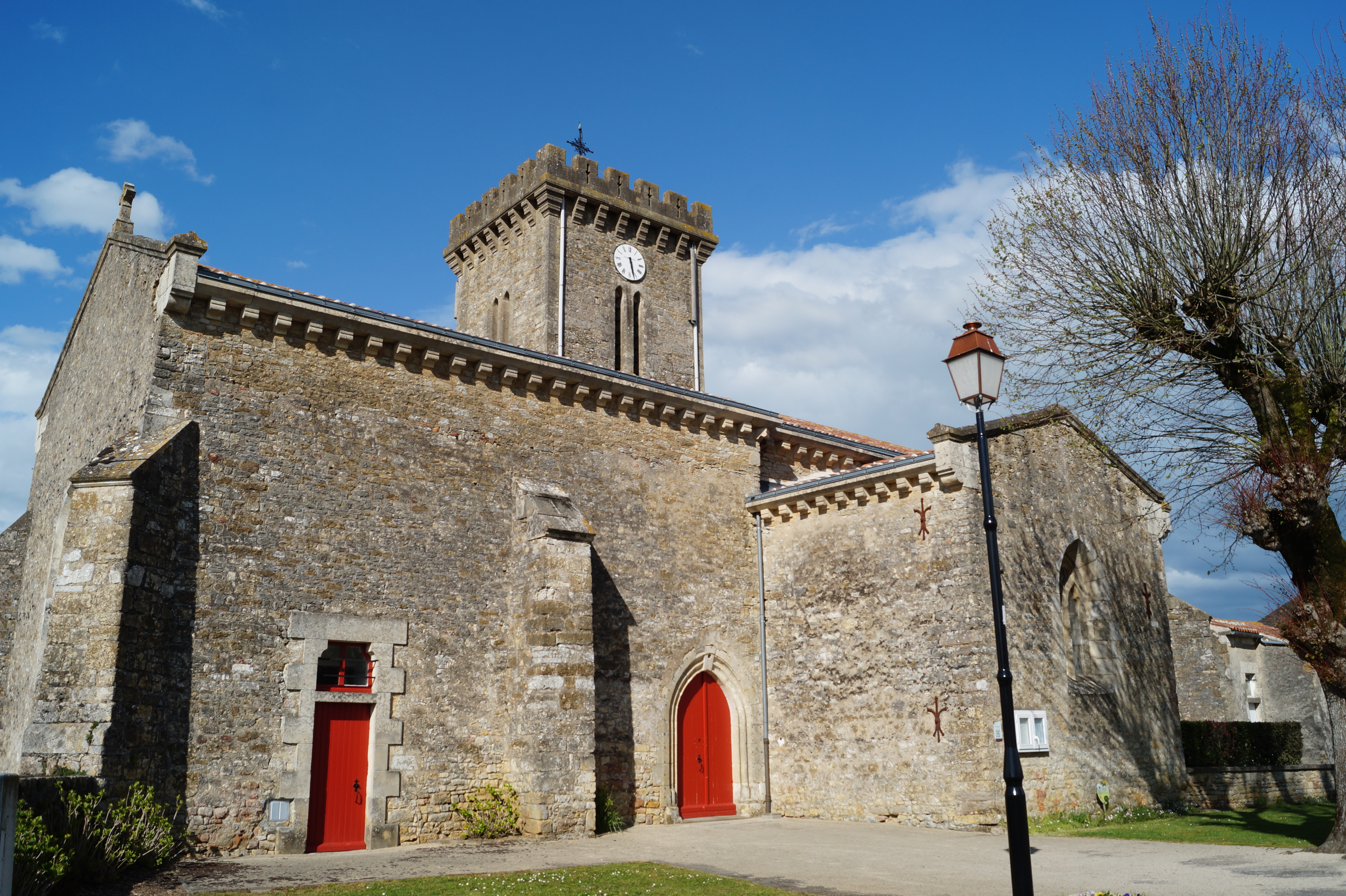
- Location of Thouarsais-Bouildroux
- Location within France Location within Pays de la Loire
- Coordinates: 46°37′12″N 0°52′45″W
- Country: France
- Region: Pays de la Loire
- Department: Vendée
- Arrondissement: Fontenay-le-Comte
- Canton: La Châtaigneraie
- Intercommunality: Pays de la Châtaigneraie
- Commune: Rives-du-Fougerais
- Area^{1}: 17.37 km^{2} (6.71 sq mi)
- Highest elevation: 128 m (420 ft)
- Lowest elevation: 62 m (203 ft)
- Population (2021): 775
  - Density: 44.6/km^{2} (116/sq mi)
- Time zone: UTC+01:00 (CET)
  - Summer (DST): UTC+02:00 (CEST)
- Postal code: 85410
- ^{1} French Land Register data, which excludes lakes, ponds, glaciers > 1 km^{2} (0.386 sq mi or 247 acres) and river estuaries.

Thouarsais-Bouildroux (French pronunciation: [twaʁsɛ bwildʁu]) is a former commune in the Vendée department in the Pays de la Loire region in western France. On 1 January 2024, it was merged into the new commune of Rives-du-Fougerais.

== See also ==
- Communes of the Vendée department
