= La Tardière =

- Part of Terval
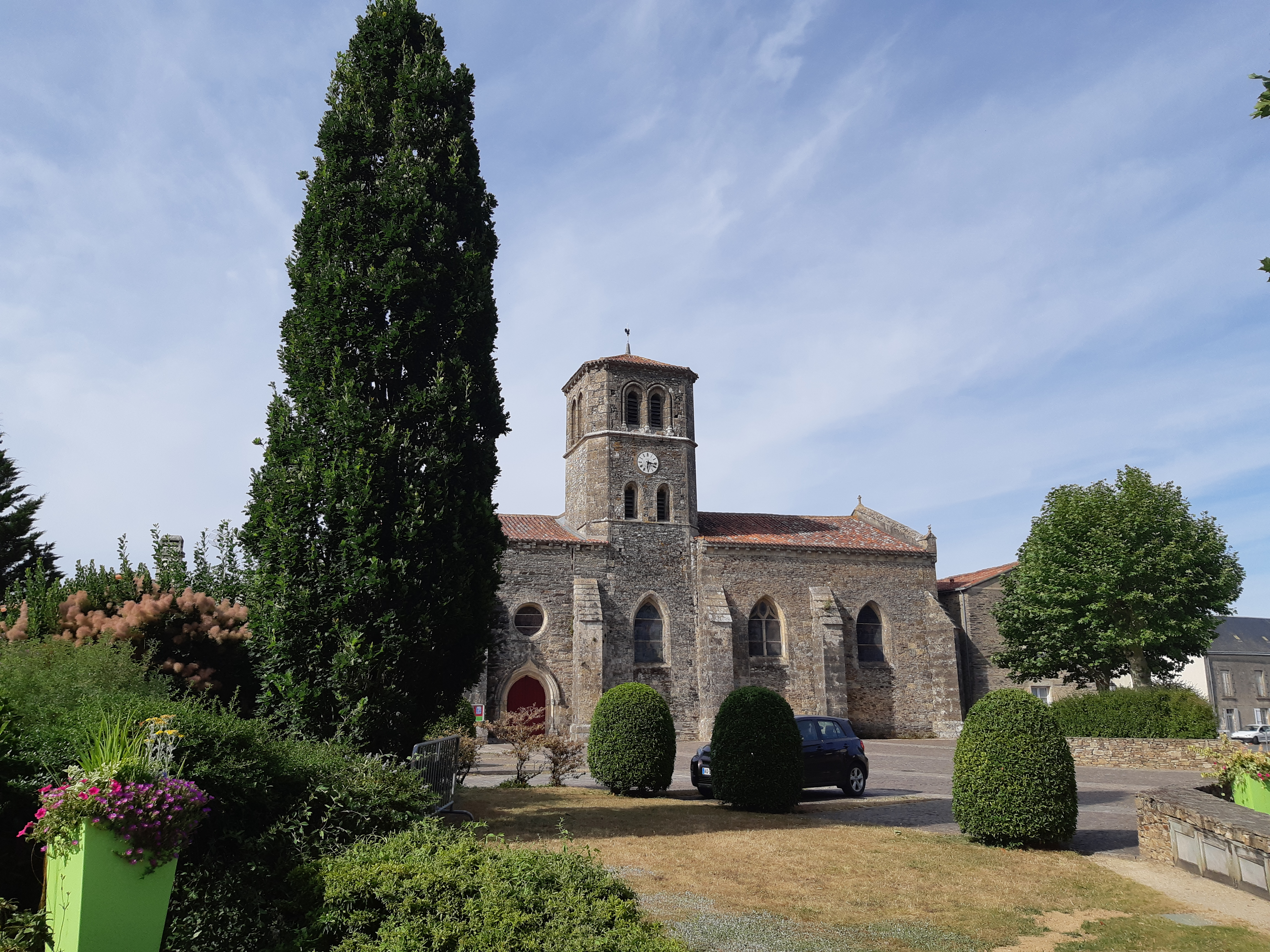

- Coat of arms
- Location of La Tardière
- Location within France Location within Pays de la Loire
- Coordinates: 46°39′41″N 0°43′56″W
- Country: France
- Region: Pays de la Loire
- Department: Vendée
- Arrondissement: Fontenay-le-Comte
- Canton: La Châtaigneraie
- Commune: Terval
- Area^{1}: 20.48 km^{2} (7.91 sq mi)
- Highest elevation: 232 m (761 ft)
- Lowest elevation: 98 m (322 ft)
- Population (2022): 1,348
  - Density: 65.82/km^{2} (170.5/sq mi)
- Time zone: UTC+01:00 (CET)
  - Summer (DST): UTC+02:00 (CEST)
- Postal code: 85120
- ^{1} French Land Register data, which excludes lakes, ponds, glaciers > 1 km^{2} (0.386 sq mi or 247 acres) and river estuaries.

La Tardière (French pronunciation: [la taʁdjɛʁ]) is a former commune in the Vendée department in the Pays de la Loire region in western France. On 1 January 2023, it was merged into the new commune of Terval.

== See also ==
- Communes of the Vendée department
