= Breuil-Barret =

- Part of Terval
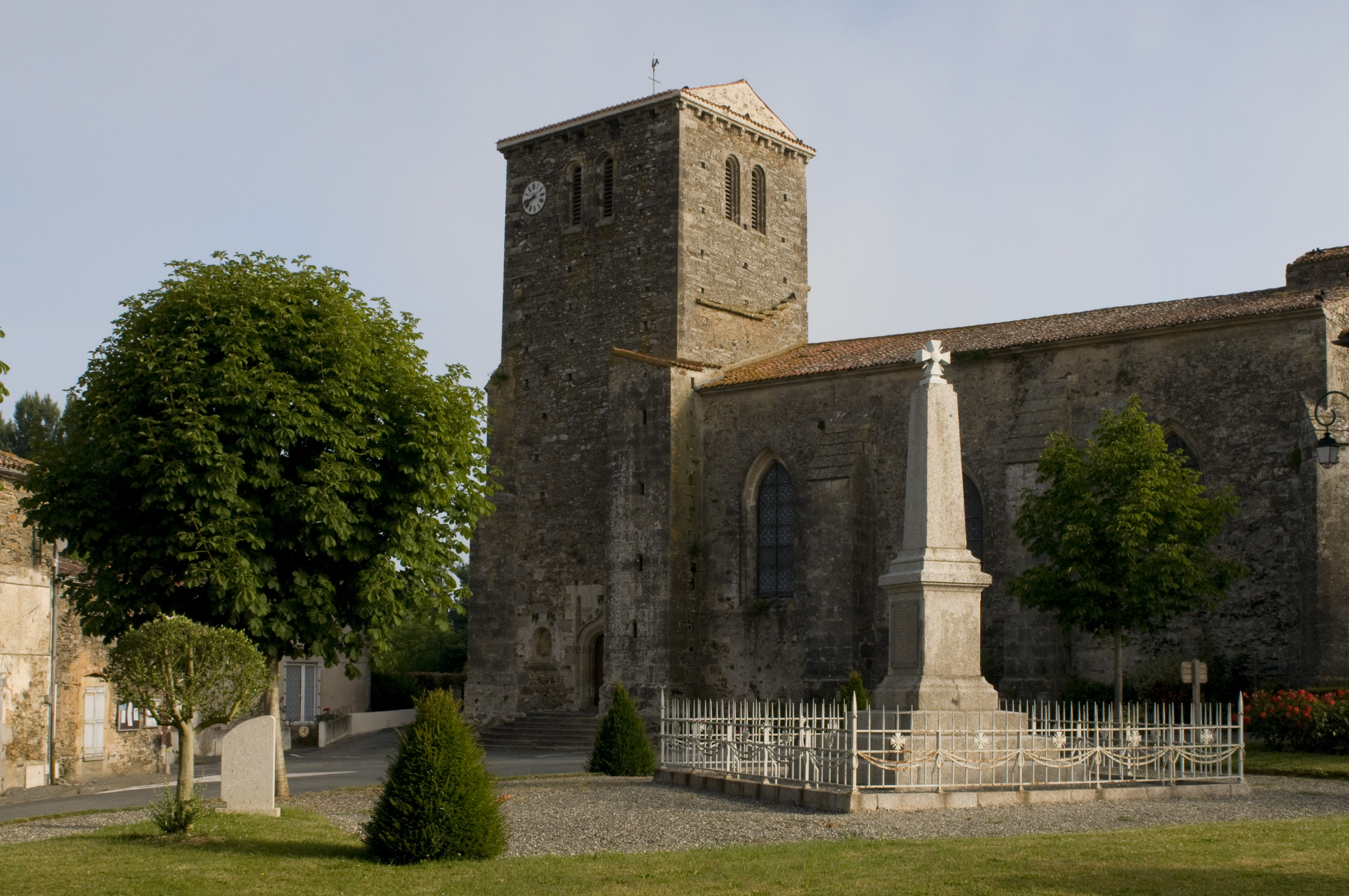
- The church of Saint-Hilaire
- Location of Breuil-Barret
- Location within France Location within Pays de la Loire
- Coordinates: 46°39′13″N 0°40′52″W
- Country: France
- Region: Pays de la Loire
- Department: Vendée
- Arrondissement: Fontenay-le-Comte
- Canton: La Châtaigneraie
- Commune: Terval
- Area^{1}: 14.74 km^{2} (5.69 sq mi)
- Highest elevation: 246 m (807 ft)
- Lowest elevation: 93 m (305 ft)
- Population (2022): 560
  - Density: 38/km^{2} (98/sq mi)
- Time zone: UTC+01:00 (CET)
  - Summer (DST): UTC+02:00 (CEST)
- Postal code: 85120
- ^{1} French Land Register data, which excludes lakes, ponds, glaciers > 1 km^{2} (0.386 sq mi or 247 acres) and river estuaries.

Breuil-Barret (French pronunciation: [bʁœj baʁɛ]) is a former commune in the Vendée department in the Pays de la Loire region in western France. On 1 January 2023, it was merged into the new commune of Terval.

== See also ==
- Communes of the Vendée department
