= Marillet =

- Commune
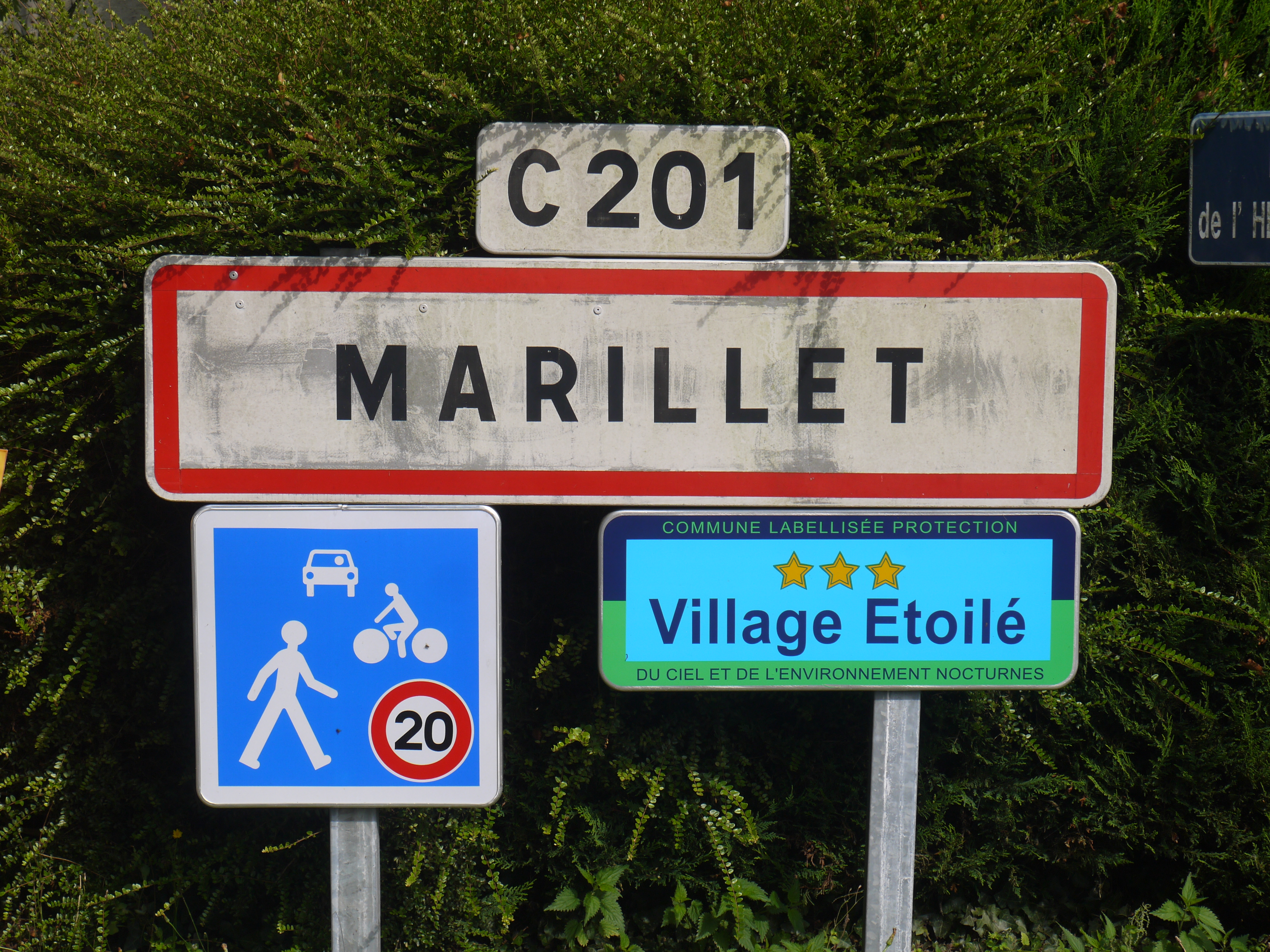
- The sign showing the entrance of Marillet

- Coat of arms
- Location of Marillet
- Location within France Location within Pays de la Loire
- Coordinates: 46°34′03″N 0°38′04″W
- Country: France
- Region: Pays de la Loire
- Department: Vendée
- Arrondissement: Fontenay-le-Comte
- Canton: La Châtaigneraie
- Intercommunality: Pays de la Châtaigneraie

Government
  - Mayor (2020–2026): Ghislaine Lesauvage
- Area^{1}: 4.25 km^{2} (1.64 sq mi)
- Highest elevation: 114 m (374 ft)
- Lowest elevation: 64 m (210 ft)
- Population (2023): 123
  - Density: 28.9/km^{2} (75.0/sq mi)
- Time zone: UTC+01:00 (CET)
  - Summer (DST): UTC+02:00 (CEST)
- INSEE/Postal code: 85136 /85240
- ^{1} French Land Register data, which excludes lakes, ponds, glaciers > 1 km^{2} (0.386 sq mi or 247 acres) and river estuaries.

Marillet (French pronunciation: [maʁijɛ]) is a commune in the Vendée department in the Pays de la Loire region in western France.

Marillet is the smallest commune in Vendée and is associated with the Puy-de-Serre and Faymoreau coal mines.

== See also ==
- Communes of the Vendée department
