= La Chapelle-aux-Lys =

- Part of Terval
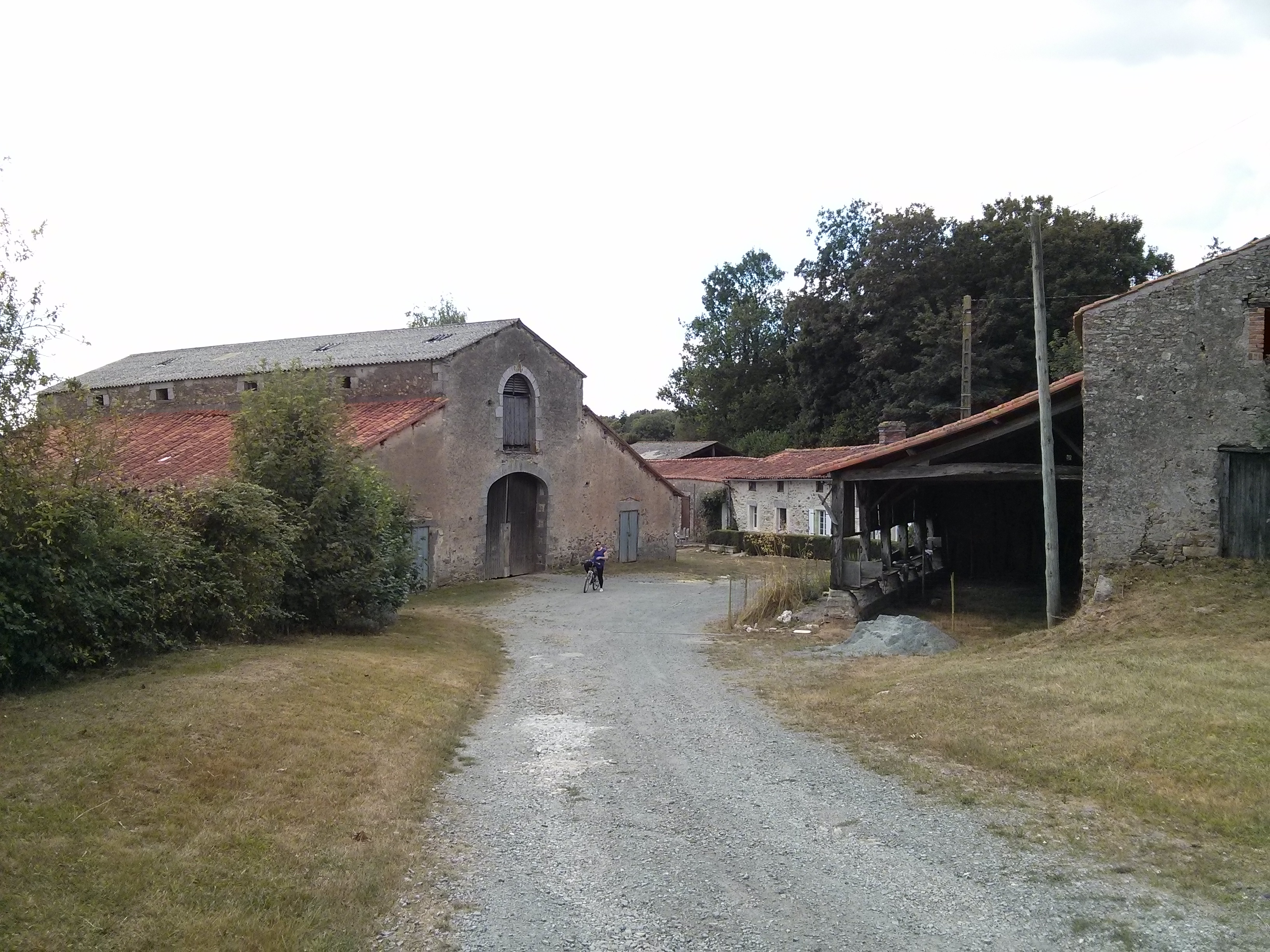
- A view within La Chapelle-aux-Lys
- Location of La Chapelle-aux-Lys
- Location within France Location within Pays de la Loire
- Coordinates: 46°37′47″N 0°39′23″W
- Country: France
- Region: Pays de la Loire
- Department: Vendée
- Arrondissement: Fontenay-le-Comte
- Canton: La Châtaigneraie
- Commune: Terval
- Area^{1}: 10.56 km^{2} (4.08 sq mi)
- Highest elevation: 230 m (750 ft)
- Lowest elevation: 87 m (285 ft)
- Population (2022): 265
  - Density: 25.1/km^{2} (65.0/sq mi)
- Time zone: UTC+01:00 (CET)
  - Summer (DST): UTC+02:00 (CEST)
- Postal code: 85120
- ^{1} French Land Register data, which excludes lakes, ponds, glaciers > 1 km^{2} (0.386 sq mi or 247 acres) and river estuaries.

La Chapelle-aux-Lys (French pronunciation: [la ʃapɛl o lis]) is a former commune in the Vendée department in the Pays de la Loire region in western France. On 1 January 2023, it was merged into the new commune of Terval.

== See also ==
- Communes of the Vendée department
