= Saint-Sulpice-en-Pareds =

- Part of Rives-du-Fougerais
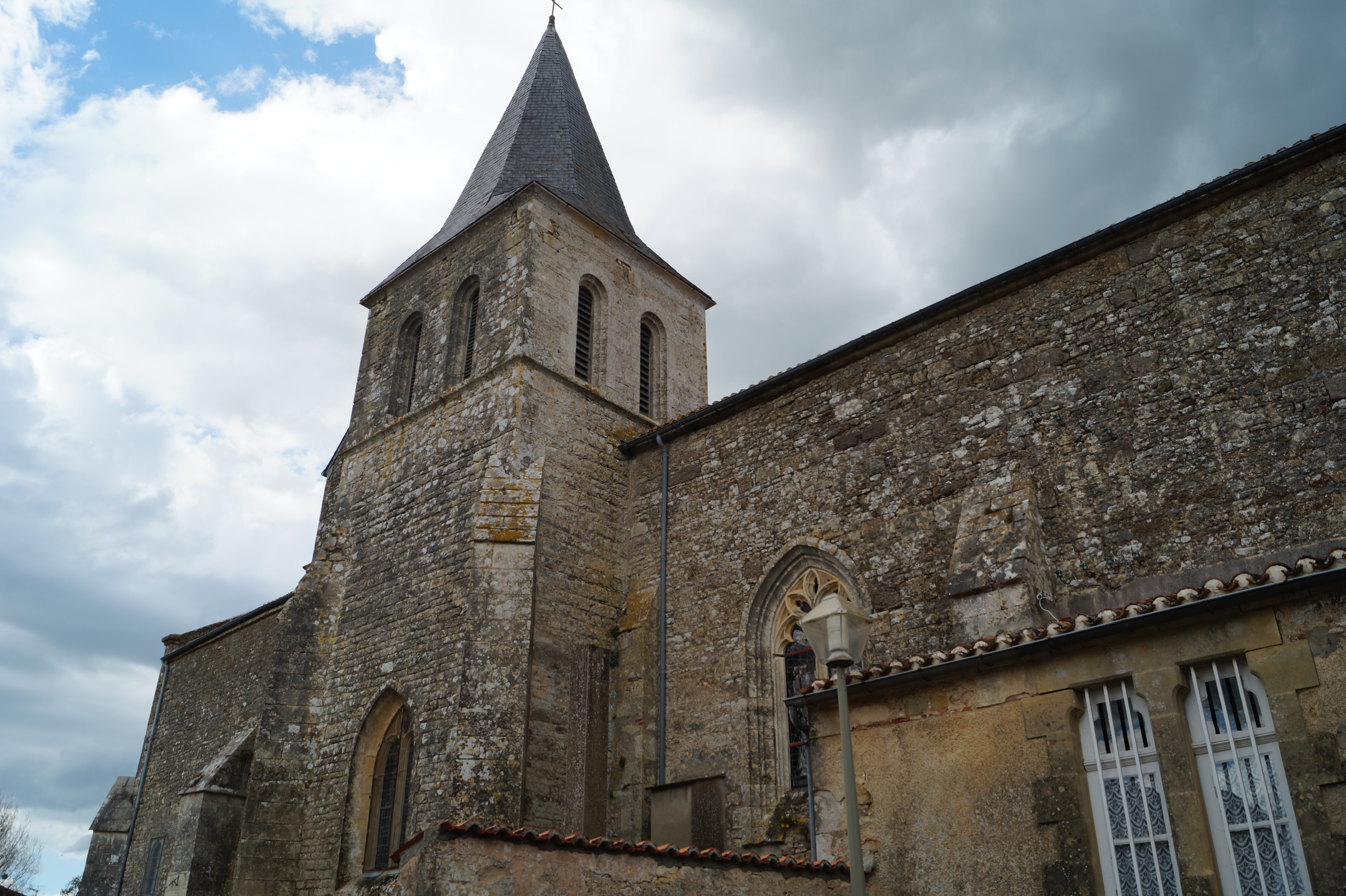

- Coat of arms
- Location of Saint-Sulpice-en-Pareds
- Location within France Location within Pays de la Loire
- Coordinates: 46°36′09″N 0°50′03″W
- Country: France
- Region: Pays de la Loire
- Department: Vendée
- Arrondissement: Fontenay-le-Comte
- Canton: La Châtaigneraie
- Commune: Rives-du-Fougerais
- Area^{1}: 13.33 km^{2} (5.15 sq mi)
- Highest elevation: 111 m (364 ft)
- Lowest elevation: 63 m (207 ft)
- Population (2021): 435
  - Density: 32.6/km^{2} (84.5/sq mi)
- Time zone: UTC+01:00 (CET)
  - Summer (DST): UTC+02:00 (CEST)
- Postal code: 85410
- ^{1} French Land Register data, which excludes lakes, ponds, glaciers > 1 km^{2} (0.386 sq mi or 247 acres) and river estuaries.

Saint-Sulpice-en-Pareds (French pronunciation: [sɛ̃ sylpis ɑ̃ paʁɛ]) is a former commune in the Vendée department of the Pays de la Loire region in western France. On 1 January 2024, it was merged into the new commune of Rives-du-Fougerais.

== See also ==
- Communes of the Vendée department
