= The Tree, the Mayor and the Mediatheque =

1993 film by Éric Rohmer

- Theatrical release poster
- French: L'Arbre, le maire et la médiathèque
- Directed by: Éric Rohmer
- Written by: Éric Rohmer
- Produced by: Françoise Etchegaray
- Starring: Pascal Greggory; Arielle Dombasle; Fabrice Luchini; Clémentine Amouroux; François-Marie Banier
- Cinematography: Diane Baratier
- Edited by: Mary Stephen
- Music by: Sébastien Erms
- Production company: Compagnie Éric Rohmer
- Distributed by: Les Films du Losange
- Release date: 10 February 1993 (France)
- Running time: 105 minutes
- Country: France
- Language: French

The Tree, the Mayor and the Mediatheque (French: L'Arbre, le maire et la médiathèque; known also as Les sept hasards) is a 1993 French comedy-drama film written and directed by Éric Rohmer. The film was shown at the 1993 Montreal World Film Festival where it received the FIPRESCI prize.

The frame story involves the mayor of an isolated French village who, to further his political ambitions, secures a grant to build a sporting and cultural centre, but the necessary felling of a fine willow outrages the schoolteacher and his daughter. Within the frame there is much debate about the current state of France: city versus country, agriculture versus industry, conservatism versus progress, the environment versus growth.

== Plot ==
In Saint-Juire-Champgillon, a remote village of traditional left-wing adherence in the Vendée, Julien Dechaumes has inherited the manor house and grounds and has been elected mayor, though he spends much of his time in Paris with his mistress. There he successfully lobbies the Ministry of Culture for a grant to build a state-of-the-art sports and media centre. By enhancing his reputation in the area, it will boost his chances of entering national politics under the socialist banner.

Opinion in the village is mixed, with the most passionate opposition coming from the schoolteacher, for whom the destruction of a 100-year-old willow symbolises all that is wrong about the plan. When a journalist on a left-wing magazine visits the village to talk to people, her editor cuts her piece to focus on the teacher and the tree. The teacher's ten-year-old daughter explains to the mayor that all the children want is not the sophisticated facilities on offer but just green space and trees. A survey reveals that the water table has dropped alarmingly, needing costly groundworks that make the whole project unviable.

== Cast ==
- Pascal Greggory as Julien Dechaumes, the mayor
- Arielle Dombasle as Bérénice Beaurivage, the mayor's lover
- Fabrice Luchini as Marc Rossignol, the school teacher
- Clémentine Amouroux as Blandine Lenoir, the reporter
- François-Marie Banier as Régis Lebrun-Blondet, the magazine editor
