= Saint-Hilaire-de-Voust =

- Commune
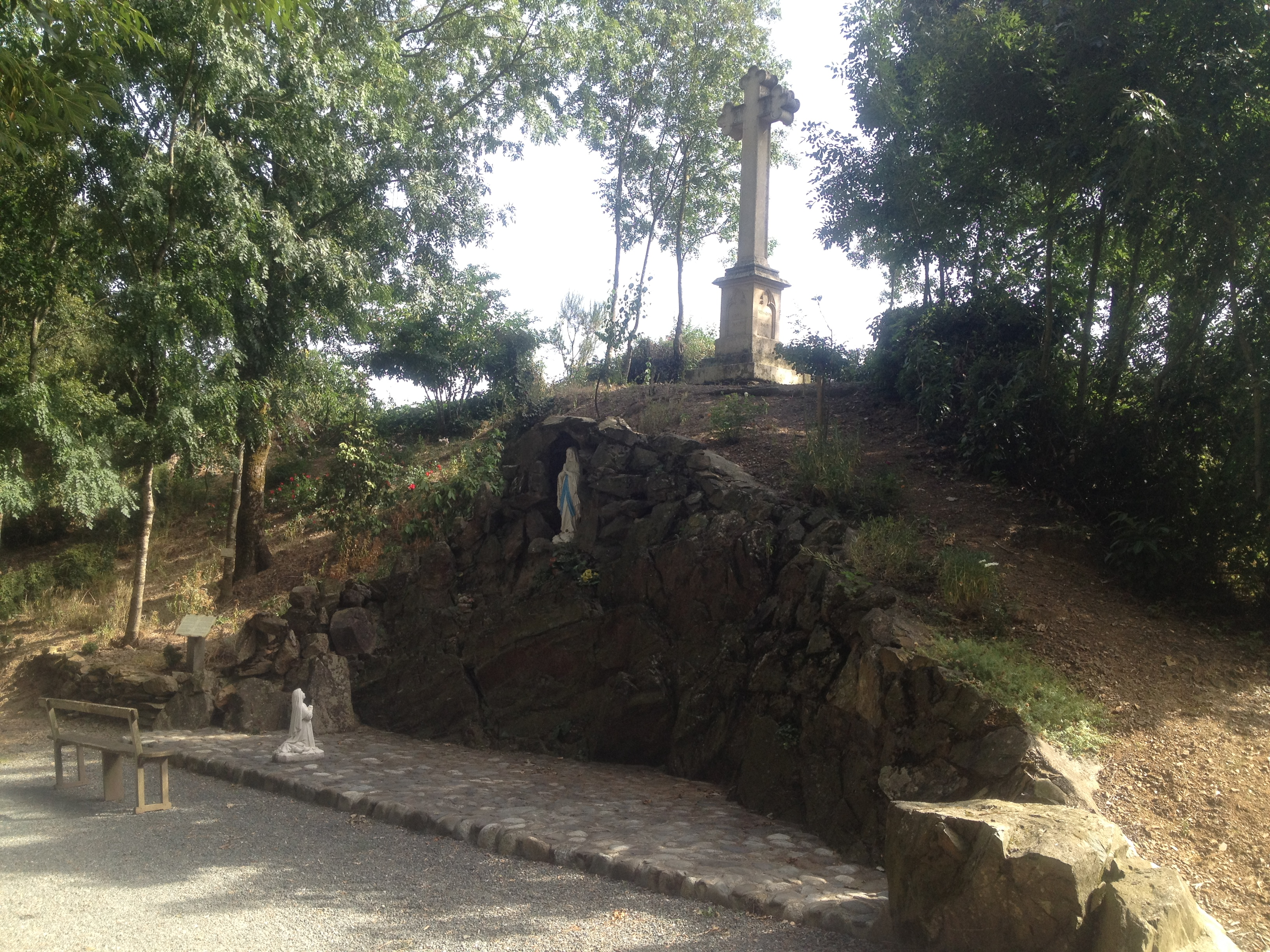
- Réplica of the grotto of Massabielle
- Location of Saint-Hilaire-de-Voust
- Location within France Location within Pays de la Loire
- Coordinates: 46°35′31″N 0°38′56″W
- Country: France
- Region: Pays de la Loire
- Department: Vendée
- Arrondissement: Fontenay-le-Comte
- Canton: La Châtaigneraie
- Intercommunality: Pays de la Châtaigneraie

Government
  - Mayor (2020–2026): Christian Chatellier
- Area^{1}: 18.86 km^{2} (7.28 sq mi)
- Highest elevation: 142 m (466 ft)
- Lowest elevation: 67 m (220 ft)
- Population (2023): 642
  - Density: 34.0/km^{2} (88.2/sq mi)
- Time zone: UTC+01:00 (CET)
  - Summer (DST): UTC+02:00 (CEST)
- INSEE/Postal code: 85229 /85120
- ^{1} French Land Register data, which excludes lakes, ponds, glaciers > 1 km^{2} (0.386 sq mi or 247 acres) and river estuaries.

Saint-Hilaire-de-Voust (French pronunciation: [sɛ̃.t‿ilɛʁ də vust]) is a commune in the Vendée department in the Pays de la Loire region in western France.

== See also ==
- Communes of the Vendée department
