= Saint-Juire-Champgillon =

- Commune
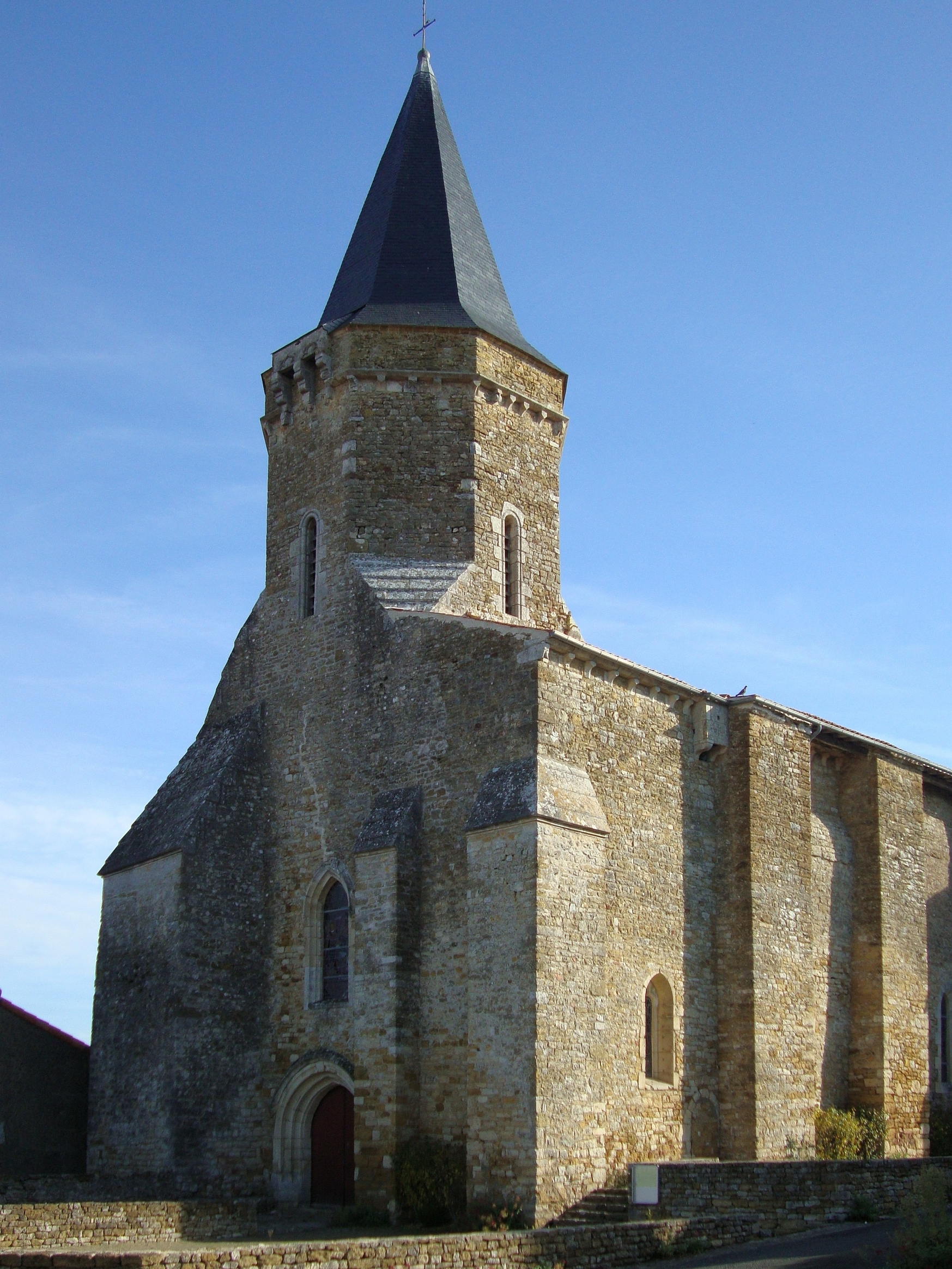
- The church of Saint-Georges, in Saint-Juire-Champgillon
- Location of Saint-Juire-Champgillon
- Location within France Location within Pays de la Loire
- Coordinates: 46°34′44″N 1°01′34″W
- Country: France
- Region: Pays de la Loire
- Department: Vendée
- Arrondissement: Fontenay-le-Comte
- Canton: La Châtaigneraie

Government
  - Mayor (2020–2026): Françoise Baudry
- Area^{1}: 20.75 km^{2} (8.01 sq mi)
- Highest elevation: 116 m (381 ft)
- Lowest elevation: 25 m (82 ft)
- Population (2023): 425
  - Density: 20.5/km^{2} (53.0/sq mi)
- Time zone: UTC+01:00 (CET)
  - Summer (DST): UTC+02:00 (CEST)
- INSEE/Postal code: 85235 /85210
- ^{1} French Land Register data, which excludes lakes, ponds, glaciers > 1 km^{2} (0.386 sq mi or 247 acres) and river estuaries.

Saint-Juire-Champgillon (French pronunciation: [sɛ̃ ʒɥiʁ ʃɑ̃ʒilɔ̃]) is a commune in the Vendée department in the Pays de la Loire region in western France.

== Geography ==
The river Smagne forms most of the commune's southern border.

== See also ==
- Communes of the Vendée department
- L'Arbre, le maire et la médiathèque, a 1993 film set in Saint-Juire-Champgillon
