= La Jaudonnière =

- Commune
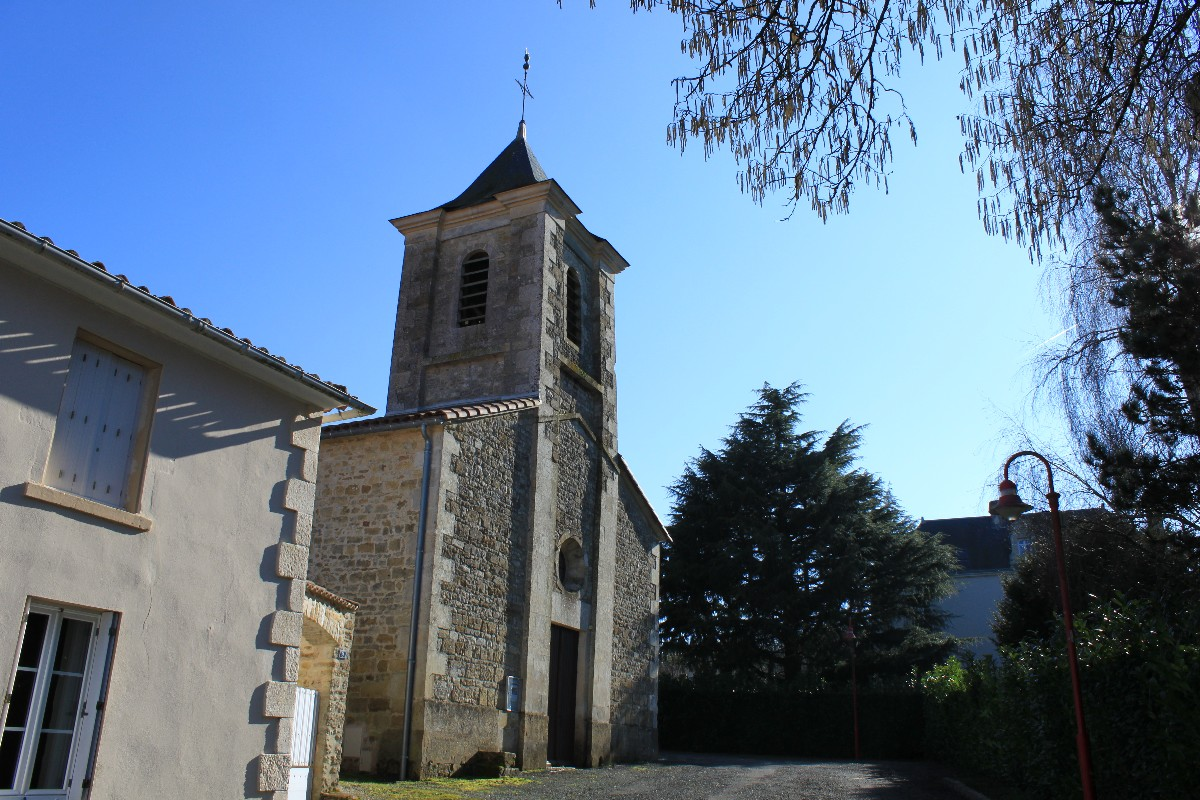
- The church of Sainte Marie-Madeleine

- Coat of arms
- Location of La Jaudonnière
- Location within France Location within Pays de la Loire
- Coordinates: 46°38′38″N 0°57′43″W
- Country: France
- Region: Pays de la Loire
- Department: Vendée
- Arrondissement: Fontenay-le-Comte
- Canton: La Châtaigneraie

Government
  - Mayor (2020–2026): Yann Pelletier
- Area^{1}: 8.27 km^{2} (3.19 sq mi)
- Highest elevation: 116 m (381 ft)
- Lowest elevation: 41 m (135 ft)
- Population (2023): 670
  - Density: 81/km^{2} (210/sq mi)
- Time zone: UTC+01:00 (CET)
  - Summer (DST): UTC+02:00 (CEST)
- INSEE/Postal code: 85115 /85110
- ^{1} French Land Register data, which excludes lakes, ponds, glaciers > 1 km^{2} (0.386 sq mi or 247 acres) and river estuaries.

La Jaudonnière (French pronunciation: [la ʒodɔnjɛʁ]) is a commune in the Vendée department in the Pays de la Loire region in western France.

== See also ==
- Communes of the Vendée department
