= Thiré =

- Commune
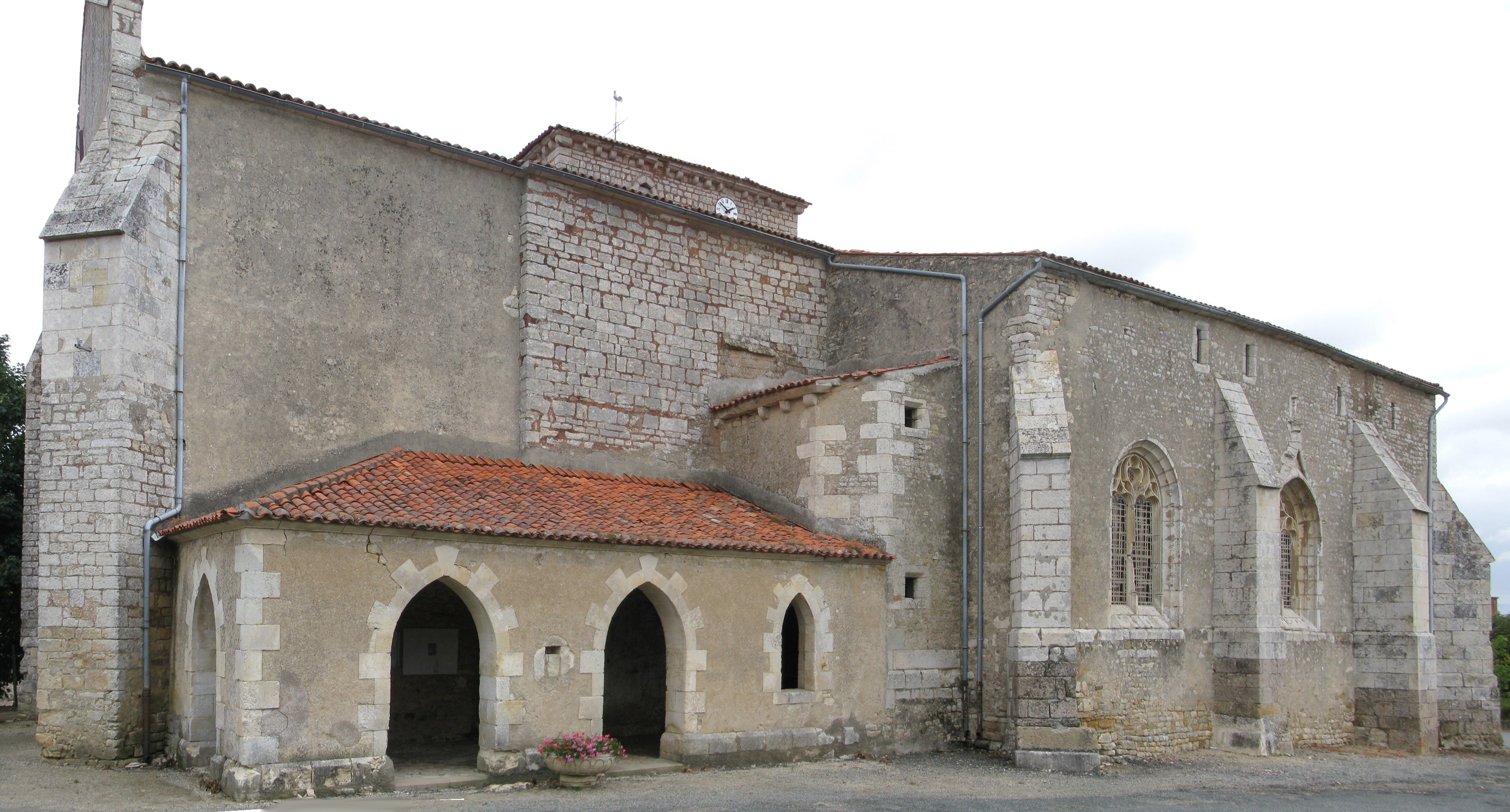
- The church in Thiré
- Location of Thiré
- Location within France Location within Pays de la Loire
- Coordinates: 46°33′00″N 1°00′22″W
- Country: France
- Region: Pays de la Loire
- Department: Vendée
- Arrondissement: Fontenay-le-Comte
- Canton: La Châtaigneraie
- Intercommunality: Sud Vendée Littoral

Government
  - Mayor (2020–2026): Catherine Denferd
- Area^{1}: 11.60 km^{2} (4.48 sq mi)
- Highest elevation: 59 m (194 ft)
- Lowest elevation: 26 m (85 ft)
- Population (2023): 532
  - Density: 45.9/km^{2} (119/sq mi)
- Time zone: UTC+01:00 (CET)
  - Summer (DST): UTC+02:00 (CEST)
- INSEE/Postal code: 85290 /85210
- ^{1} French Land Register data, which excludes lakes, ponds, glaciers > 1 km^{2} (0.386 sq mi or 247 acres) and river estuaries.

Thiré (French pronunciation: [tiʁe]) is a commune in the Vendée department in the Pays de la Loire region in western France.

== Geography ==
The village lies on the left bank of the Smagne, which forms all of the commune's northern border.

== See also ==
- Communes of the Vendée department
