= Terval =

- Commune
- Location of Terval
- Location within France Location within Pays de la Loire
- Coordinates: 46°39′41″N 0°43′56″W
- Country: France
- Region: Pays de la Loire
- Department: Vendée
- Arrondissement: Fontenay-le-Comte
- Canton: La Châtaigneraie
- Intercommunality: Pays de la Châtaigneraie

Government
  - Mayor (2023–2026): Damien Crabeil
- Area^{1}: 45.78 km^{2} (17.68 sq mi)
- Highest elevation: 246 m (807 ft)
- Lowest elevation: 93 m (305 ft)
- Population (2023): 2,147
  - Density: 46.90/km^{2} (121.5/sq mi)
- Time zone: UTC+01:00 (CET)
  - Summer (DST): UTC+02:00 (CEST)
- INSEE/Postal code: 85289 /85120
- ^{1} French Land Register data, which excludes lakes, ponds, glaciers > 1 km^{2} (0.386 sq mi or 247 acres) and river estuaries.

Terval (French pronunciation: [tɛʁval]) is a commune in the Vendée department in the Pays de la Loire region in western France. It was established as a commune nouvelle on 1 January 2023 from the merger of the communes of La Tardière, Breuil-Barret and La Chapelle-aux-Lys.

== Population ==
Population data refer to the area corresponding with the commune as of January 2025.

Historical population
Year	Pop.	±% p.a.
1968	2,009	—
1975	2,022	+0.09%
1982	2,307	+1.90%
1990	2,375	+0.36%
1999	2,156	−1.07%
2007	2,147	−0.05%
2012	2,216	+0.63%
2017	2,195	−0.19%
2023	2,147	−0.37%
Source: INSEE

== See also ==
- Communes of the Vendée department
