= Sérigné =

- Commune
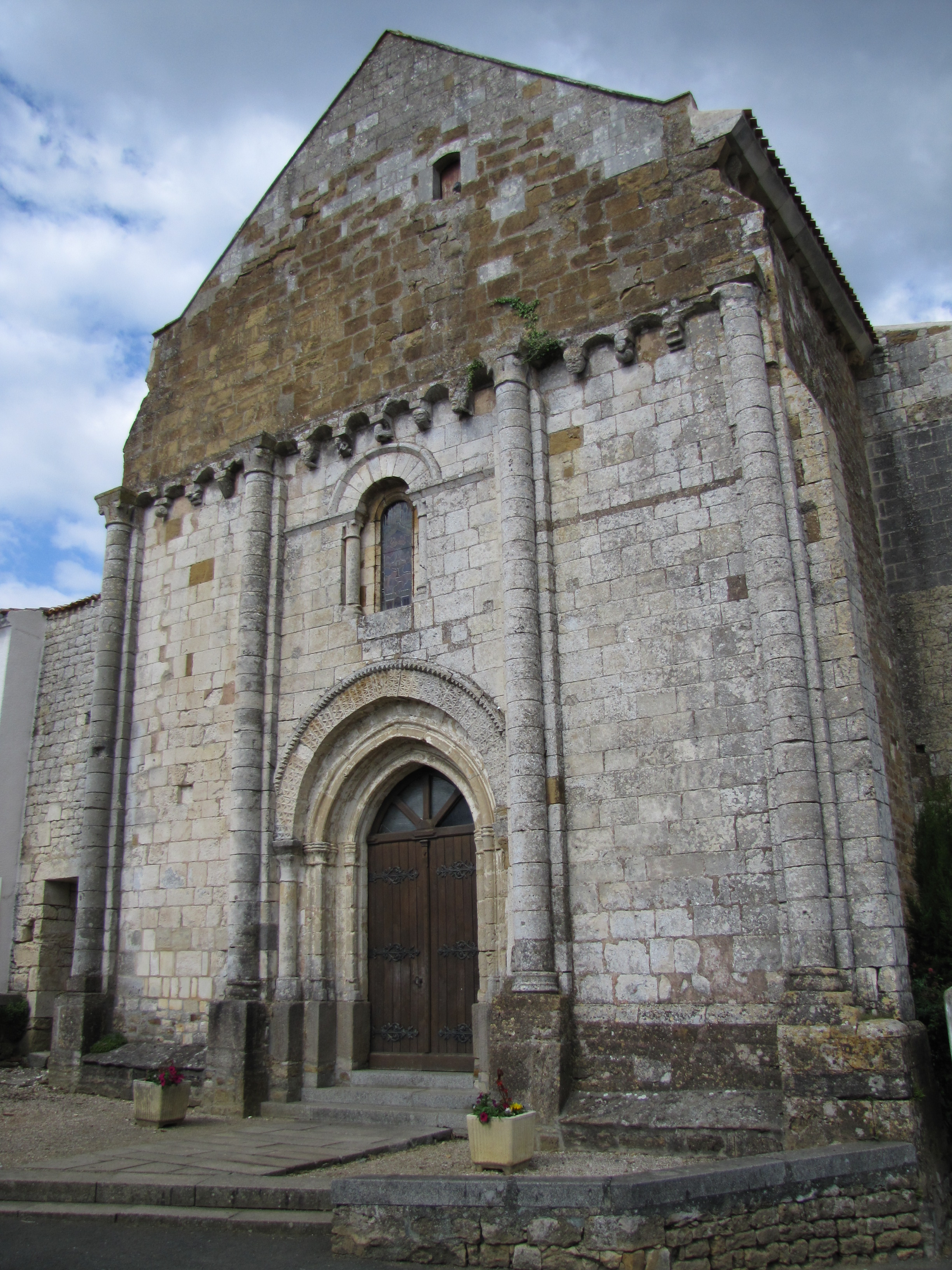
- The church in Sérigné
- Location of Sérigné
- Location within France Location within Pays de la Loire
- Coordinates: 46°30′04″N 0°50′41″W
- Country: France
- Region: Pays de la Loire
- Department: Vendée
- Arrondissement: Fontenay-le-Comte
- Canton: La Châtaigneraie
- Intercommunality: Pays de Fontenay-Vendée

Government
  - Mayor (2020–2026): Yves Baudry
- Area^{1}: 18.69 km^{2} (7.22 sq mi)
- Highest elevation: 98 m (322 ft)
- Lowest elevation: 11 m (36 ft)
- Population (2023): 1,048
  - Density: 56.07/km^{2} (145.2/sq mi)
- Time zone: UTC+01:00 (CET)
  - Summer (DST): UTC+02:00 (CEST)
- INSEE/Postal code: 85281 /85200
- ^{1} French Land Register data, which excludes lakes, ponds, glaciers > 1 km^{2} (0.386 sq mi or 247 acres) and river estuaries.

Sérigné (French pronunciation: [seʁiɲe]) is a commune in the Vendée department in the Pays de la Loire region in western France. It is located 5 km northwest from Fontenay-le-Comte and 48 km southeast from La Roche-sur-Yon, the capital city of Vendée.

== See also ==
- Communes of the Vendée department
