= Saint-Martin-des-Fontaines =

- Commune
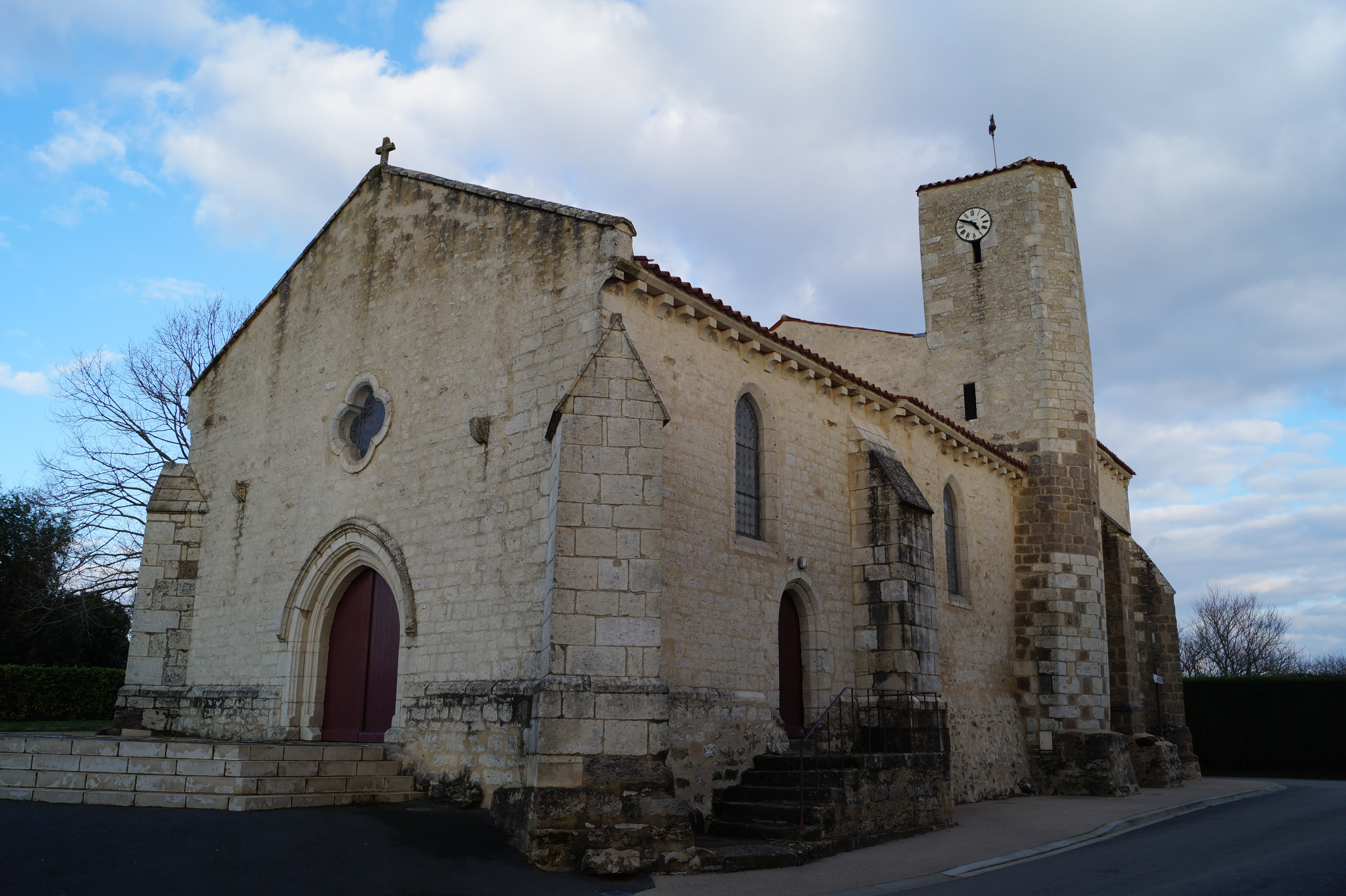
- Church of Saint Martin in Saint-Martin-des-Fontaines
- Location of Saint-Martin-des-Fontaines
- Location within France Location within Pays de la Loire
- Coordinates: 46°32′30″N 0°54′12″W
- Country: France
- Region: Pays de la Loire
- Department: Vendée
- Arrondissement: Fontenay-le-Comte
- Canton: La Châtaigneraie

Government
  - Mayor (2020–2026): Philippe Hernandez
- Area^{1}: 5.64 km^{2} (2.18 sq mi)
- Highest elevation: 87 m (285 ft)
- Lowest elevation: 35 m (115 ft)
- Population (2023): 166
  - Density: 29.4/km^{2} (76.2/sq mi)
- Time zone: UTC+01:00 (CET)
  - Summer (DST): UTC+02:00 (CEST)
- INSEE/Postal code: 85245 /85570
- ^{1} French Land Register data, which excludes lakes, ponds, glaciers > 1 km^{2} (0.386 sq mi or 247 acres) and river estuaries.

Saint-Martin-des-Fontaines (French pronunciation: [sɛ̃ maʁtɛ̃ de fɔ̃tɛn]) is a commune in the Vendée department in the Pays de la Loire region in western France.

== Geography ==
The river Smagne forms all of the commune's northern border.

== See also ==
- Communes of the Vendée department
