= Smagne =

River in France

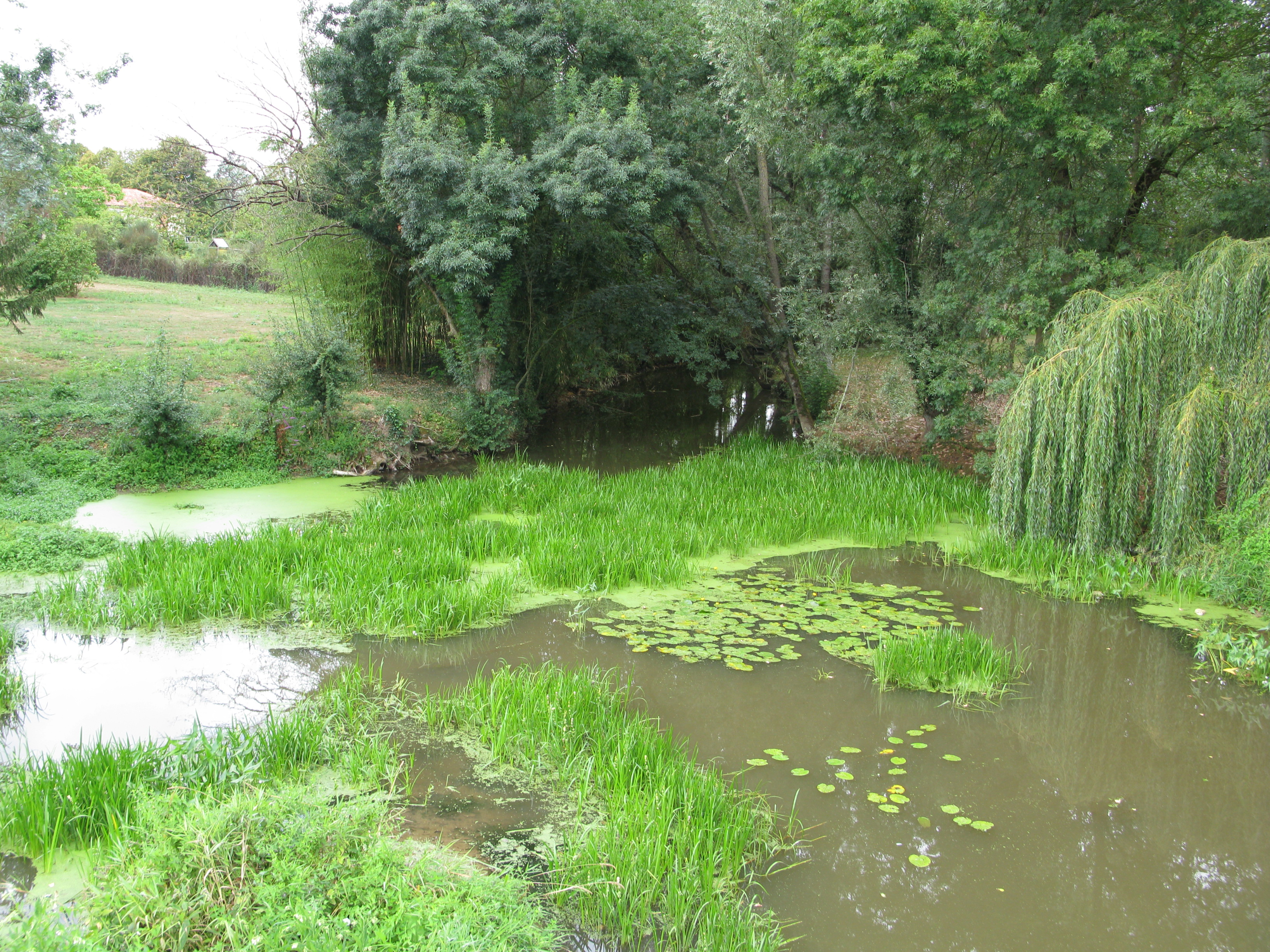

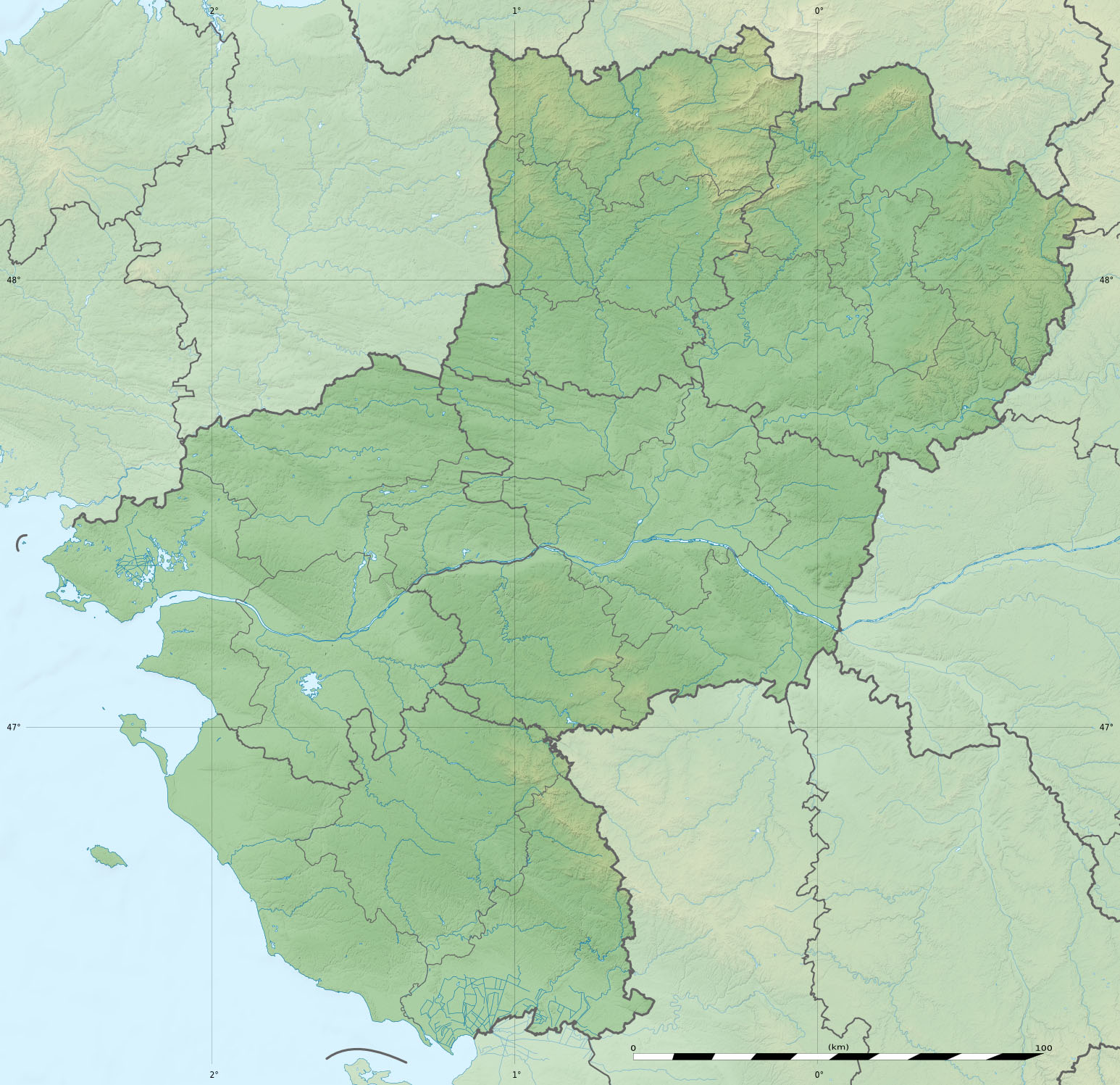
- Location within France Location within Pays de la Loire

Location
- Country: France

Physical characteristics
- Source
  - location: Bourneau
  - coordinates: 46°33′13″N 00°49′40″W
  - elevation: 105 m (344 ft)
- Mouth
  - location: Lay
  - coordinates: 46°32′13″N 01°11′57″W
  - elevation: 7 m (23 ft)
- Length: 50.3 km (31.3 mi)
- Basin size: 190 km^{2} (73 sq mi)
- Discharge
  - average: 1.54 m^{3}/s (54 cu ft/s)

Basin features
- Progression: Lay→ Bay of Biscay

The Smagne (French pronunciation: [smaɲ]) is a 50.3-kilometre-long (31.3 mi) river in the Vendée département, western France. Its source is near Bourseguin, a hamlet in Bourneau. It flows generally west. It is a left tributary of the Lay into which it flows between Bessay and Mareuil-sur-Lay-Dissais.

== Communes along its course ==
This list is ordered from source to mouth:

- Vendée: Bourneau, Saint-Cyr-des-Gâts, Marsais-Sainte-Radégonde, Saint-Martin-des-Fontaines, Saint-Laurent-de-la-Salle, Saint-Valérien, La Chapelle-Thémer, Thiré, Saint-Juire-Champgillon, Sainte-Hermine, Sainte-Pexine, Saint-Jean-de-Beugné, Bessay, Corpe, Mareuil-sur-Lay-Dissais
