= Corpe =

- Commune
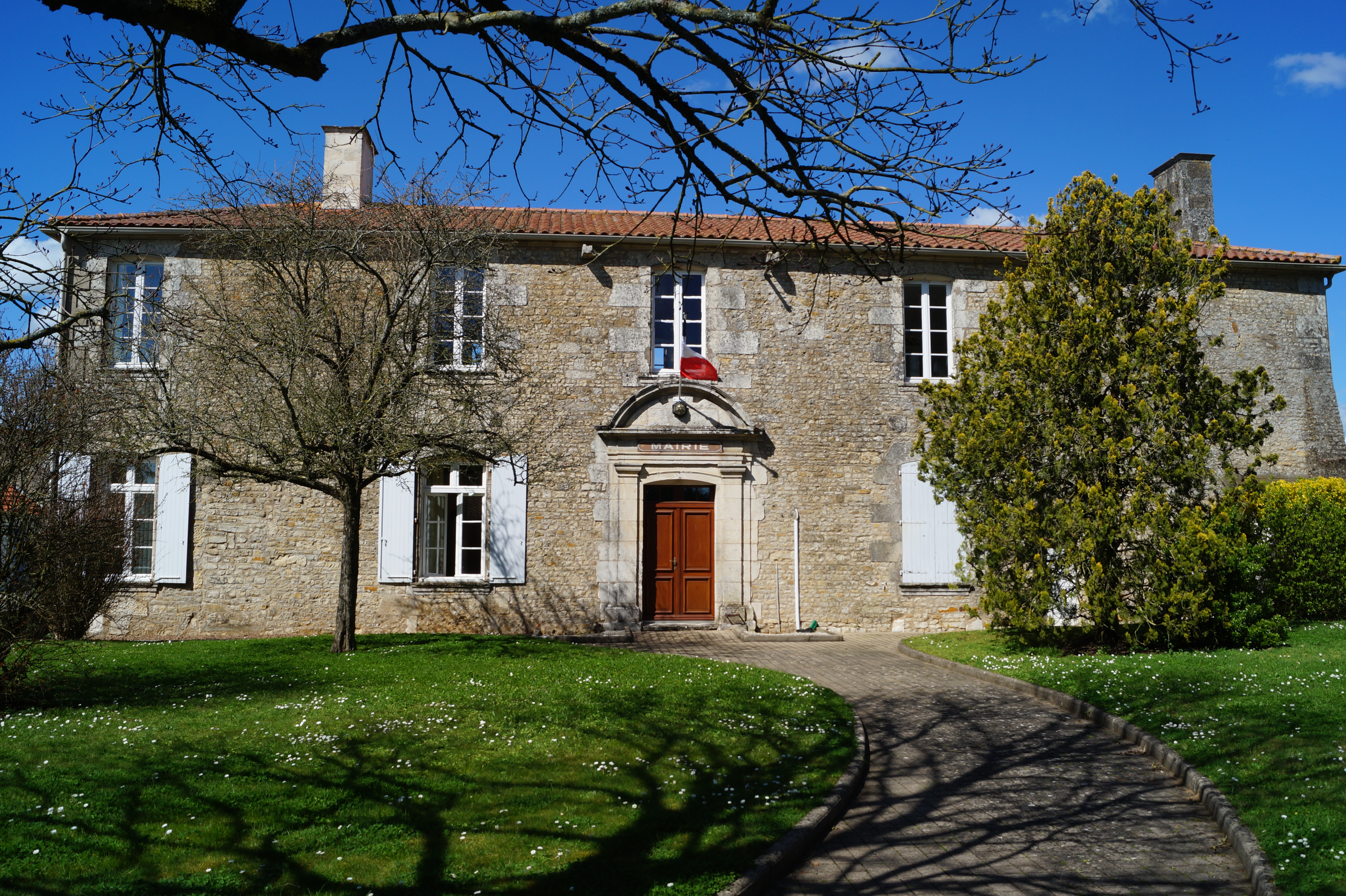
- Town hall of Corpe
- Location of Corpe
- Location within France Location within Pays de la Loire
- Coordinates: 46°30′21″N 1°10′51″W
- Country: France
- Region: Pays de la Loire
- Department: Vendée
- Arrondissement: Fontenay-le-Comte
- Canton: Mareuil-sur-Lay-Dissais
- Intercommunality: Sud Vendée Littoral

Government
  - Mayor (2020–2026): Nathalie Artaillou
- Area^{1}: 17.10 km^{2} (6.60 sq mi)
- Highest elevation: 43 m (141 ft)
- Lowest elevation: 7 m (23 ft)
- Population (2023): 1,024
  - Density: 59.88/km^{2} (155.1/sq mi)
- Time zone: UTC+01:00 (CET)
  - Summer (DST): UTC+02:00 (CEST)
- INSEE/Postal code: 85073 /85320
- ^{1} French Land Register data, which excludes lakes, ponds, glaciers > 1 km^{2} (0.386 sq mi or 247 acres) and river estuaries.

Corpe (French pronunciation: [kɔʁp]) is a commune of the Vendée department in the Pays de la Loire region in western France.

== History ==
The name Corpe is derived from an old French word for a crow 'Corp'. Corpe is part of the canton of Mareuil-sur-Lay and was originally an agricultural community. It is recorded in the rolls of the Battle of Agincort that Monsegnior de Corpe was captured by the English and held ransom at the sum of 200,000 billets. The price of his ransom reflects the fact that he was a major player in the war as the ransom for a Man at Arms was 1,000 billets. There is no record of any such ransom ever being paid.

More recently as the number of people employed in farming declined due to mechanisation, Corpe grew to accommodate people working in the businesses in and around Luçon due to the good communications. The wealth of shops and businesses in nearby Luçon and Mareuil-sur-Lay means that there are few facilities in Corpe, only a church and a cafe. A new Zone Artisanale is planned at La Frise to accommodate local tradesmen and is due to start construction in 2013.

== Geography ==
The river Smagne forms most of the commune's northern border.

== Transportation ==
The main road from Luçon to La Roche sur Yon (D746) passes very close to the village, the A83 motorway is only 12 km away and the beaches of south Vendée are less than 30 minutes by car. The village is entirely surrounded by farmland and provides a tranquil location which is however well connected.

== See also ==
- Communes of the Vendée department
