= La Chapelle-Thémer =

- Commune
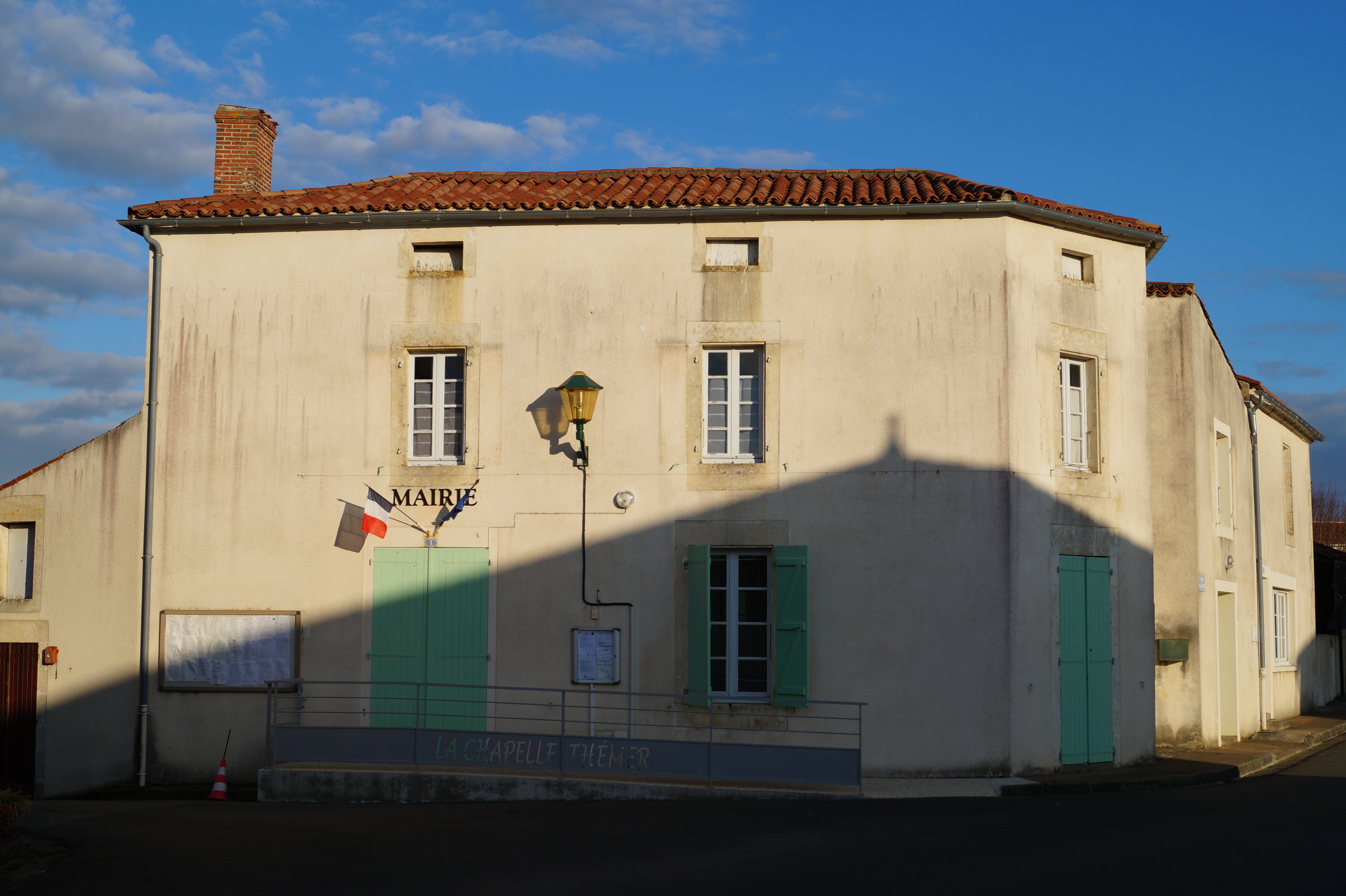
- Location of La Chapelle-Thémer
- Location within France Location within Pays de la Loire
- Coordinates: 46°33′33″N 0°57′17″W
- Country: France
- Region: Pays de la Loire
- Department: Vendée
- Arrondissement: Fontenay-le-Comte
- Canton: La Châtaigneraie

Government
  - Mayor (2020–2026): David Pelletier
- Area^{1}: 15.10 km^{2} (5.83 sq mi)
- Highest elevation: 97 m (318 ft)
- Lowest elevation: 29 m (95 ft)
- Population (2023): 393
  - Density: 26.0/km^{2} (67.4/sq mi)
- Time zone: UTC+01:00 (CET)
  - Summer (DST): UTC+02:00 (CEST)
- INSEE/Postal code: 85056 /85210
- ^{1} French Land Register data, which excludes lakes, ponds, glaciers > 1 km^{2} (0.386 sq mi or 247 acres) and river estuaries.

La Chapelle-Thémer (French pronunciation: [la ʃapɛl temɛʁ]) is a commune in the Vendée department in the Pays de la Loire region in western France.

It is situated about 50 minutes northwest of La Rochelle and a similar distance from the beautiful Vendee beaches.

== Geography ==
The river Smagne forms all of the commune's southern border.

== See also ==
- Communes of the Vendée department
