= L'Hermenault =

- Commune
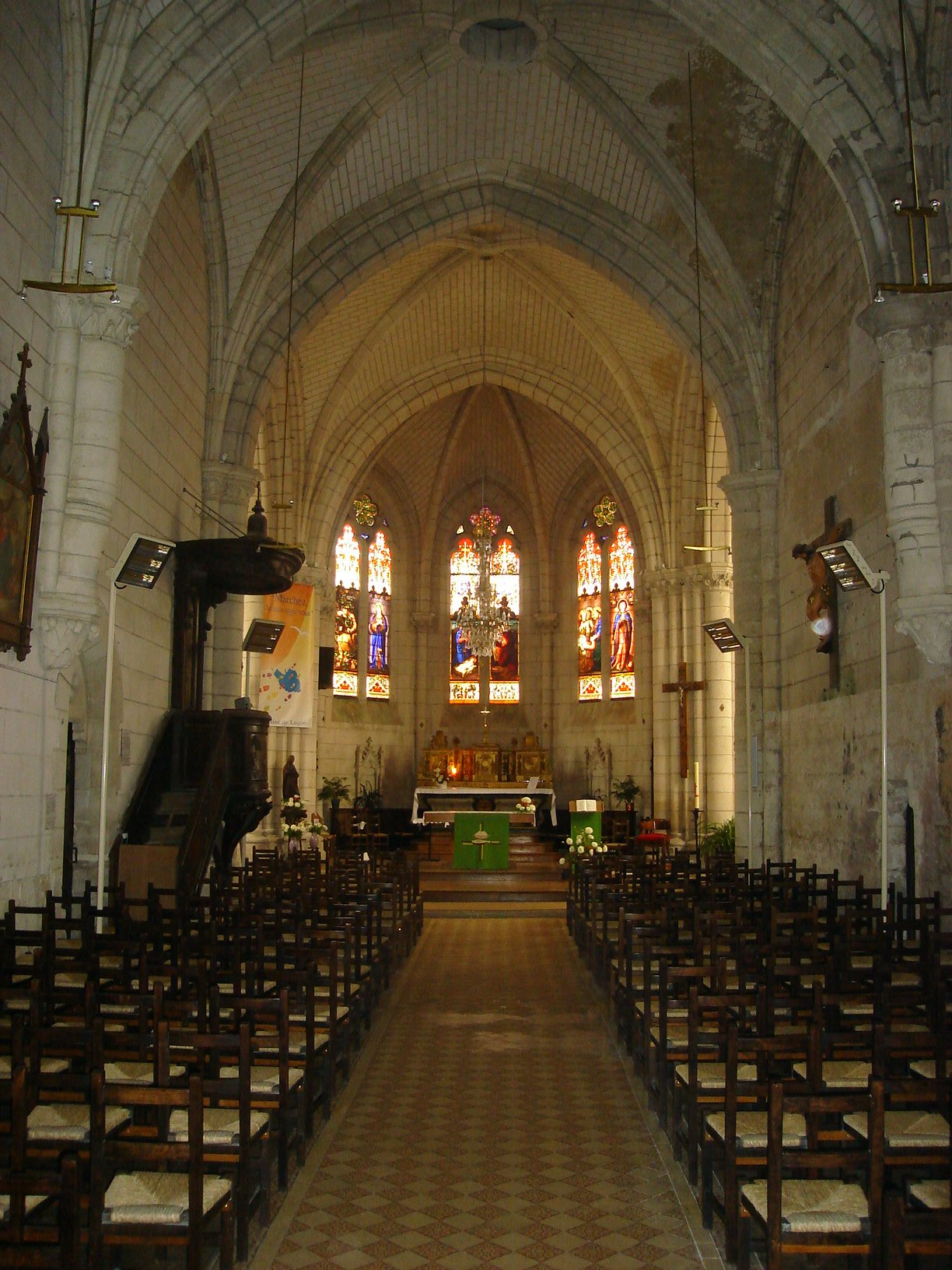
- The nave in the church of the Nativity of Our Lady

- Coat of arms
- Location of L'Hermenault
- Location within France Location within Pays de la Loire
- Coordinates: 46°31′13″N 0°54′01″W
- Country: France
- Region: Pays de la Loire
- Department: Vendée
- Arrondissement: Fontenay-le-Comte
- Canton: La Châtaigneraie

Government
  - Mayor (2020–2026): Yves Germain
- Area^{1}: 11.42 km^{2} (4.41 sq mi)
- Highest elevation: 72 m (236 ft)
- Lowest elevation: 22 m (72 ft)
- Population (2023): 914
  - Density: 80.0/km^{2} (207/sq mi)
- Time zone: UTC+01:00 (CET)
  - Summer (DST): UTC+02:00 (CEST)
- INSEE/Postal code: 85110 /85570
- ^{1} French Land Register data, which excludes lakes, ponds, glaciers > 1 km^{2} (0.386 sq mi or 247 acres) and river estuaries.

L'Hermenault (French pronunciation: [lɛʁməno]) is a commune in the Vendée department in the Pays de la Loire region in western France.

== See also ==
- Communes of the Vendée department
