= Antigny, Vendée =

Antigny
- Commune
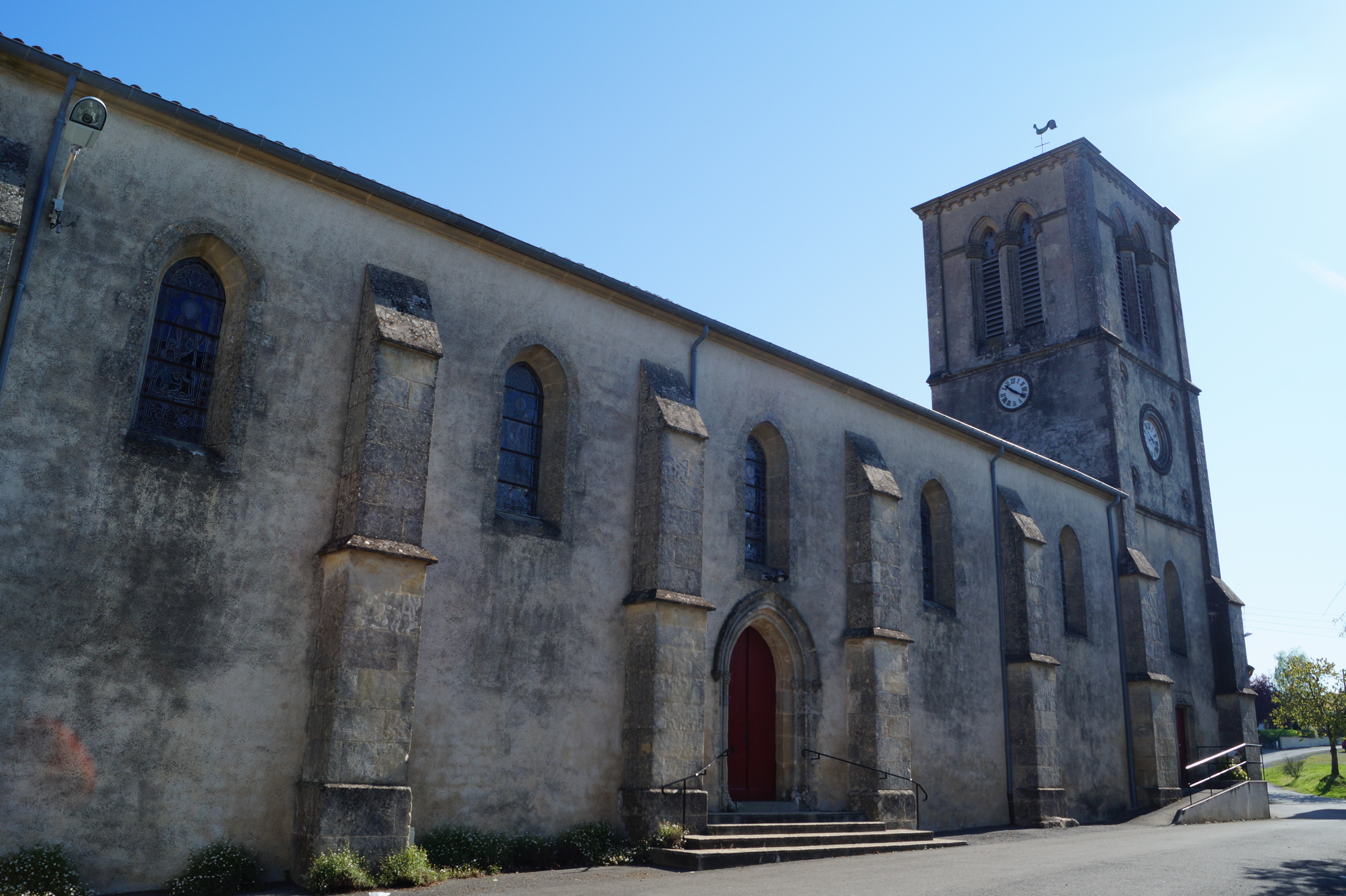
- The church of Saint-Hilaire, Antigny
- Location of Antigny
- Location within France Location within Pays de la Loire
- Coordinates: 46°37′15″N 0°46′06″W
- Country: France
- Region: Pays de la Loire
- Department: Vendée
- Arrondissement: Fontenay-le-Comte
- Canton: La Châtaigneraie
- Intercommunality: Pays de la Châtaigneraie

Government
  - Mayor (2020–2026): Yvon Gourmaud
- Area^{1}: 22.17 km^{2} (8.56 sq mi)
- Elevation: 11 m (36 ft)
- Highest elevation: 138 m (453 ft)
- Lowest elevation: 47 m (154 ft)
- Population (2023): 1,027
  - Density: 46.32/km^{2} (120.0/sq mi)
- Time zone: UTC+01:00 (CET)
  - Summer (DST): UTC+02:00 (CEST)
- INSEE/Postal code: 85005 /85120
- ^{1} French Land Register data, which excludes lakes, ponds, glaciers > 1 km^{2} (0.386 sq mi or 247 acres) and river estuaries.

Antigny (French pronunciation: [ɑ̃tiɲi]) is a commune in the Vendée department in the Pays de la Loire region in western France.

== See also ==
- Communes of the Vendée department
