= La Caillère-Saint-Hilaire =

- Commune
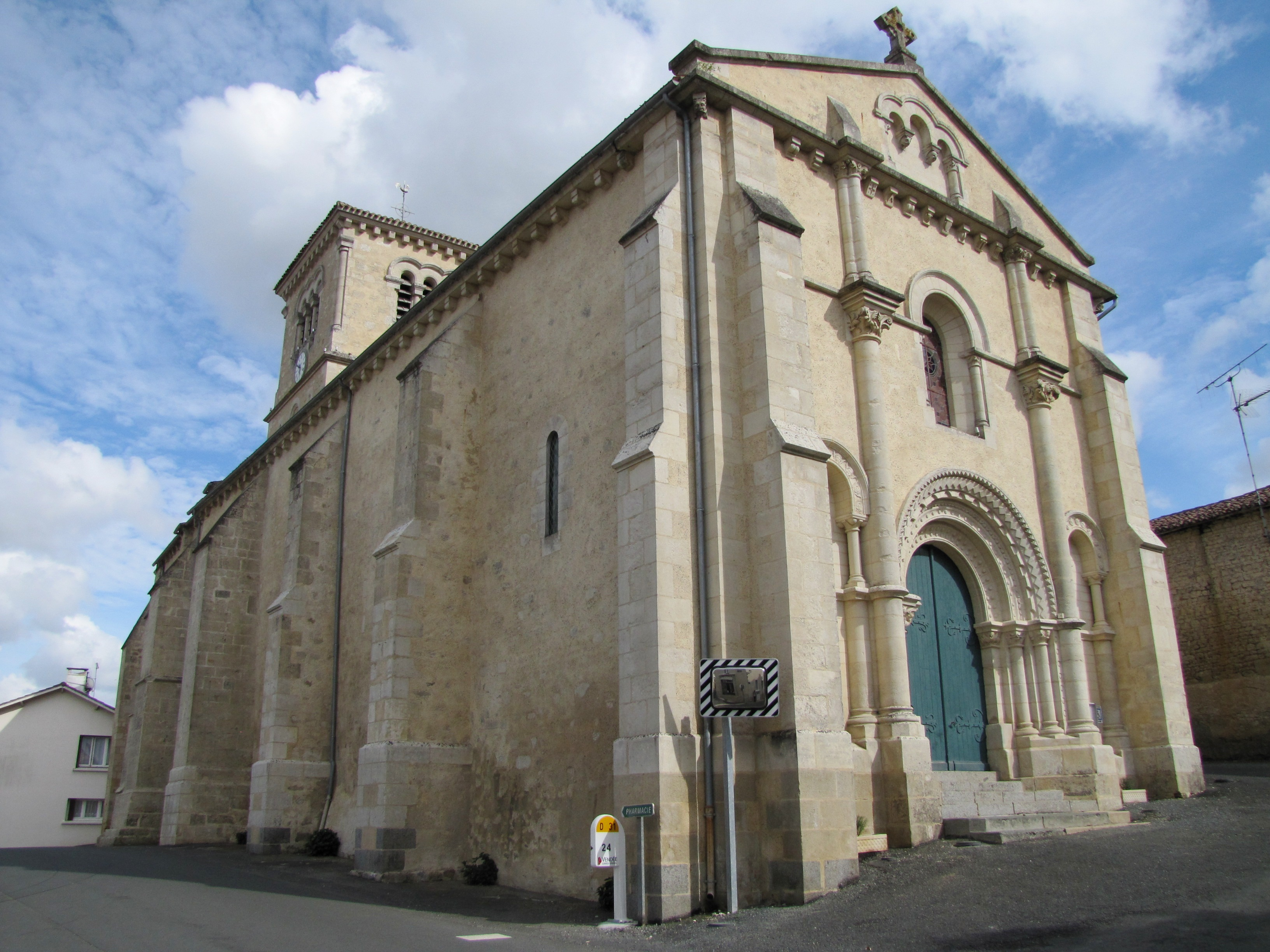
- The church in La Caillère-Saint-Hilaire

- Coat of arms
- Location of La Caillère-Saint-Hilaire
- Location within France Location within Pays de la Loire
- Coordinates: 46°37′10″N 0°54′36″W
- Country: France
- Region: Pays de la Loire
- Department: Vendée
- Arrondissement: Fontenay-le-Comte
- Canton: La Châtaigneraie
- Intercommunality: Sud Vendée Littoral

Government
  - Mayor (2024–2026): Christian Peaud
- Area^{1}: 15.28 km^{2} (5.90 sq mi)
- Highest elevation: 137 m (449 ft)
- Lowest elevation: 49 m (161 ft)
- Population (2023): 1,100
  - Density: 72/km^{2} (190/sq mi)
- Time zone: UTC+01:00 (CET)
  - Summer (DST): UTC+02:00 (CEST)
- INSEE/Postal code: 85040 /85410
- ^{1} French Land Register data, which excludes lakes, ponds, glaciers > 1 km^{2} (0.386 sq mi or 247 acres) and river estuaries.

La Caillère-Saint-Hilaire (French pronunciation: [la kajɛʁ sɛ̃.t‿ilɛʁ]) is a commune in the Vendée department in the Pays de la Loire region in western France.

== See also ==
- Communes of the Vendée department
