= Saint-Valérien, Vendée =

Saint-Valérien
- Commune
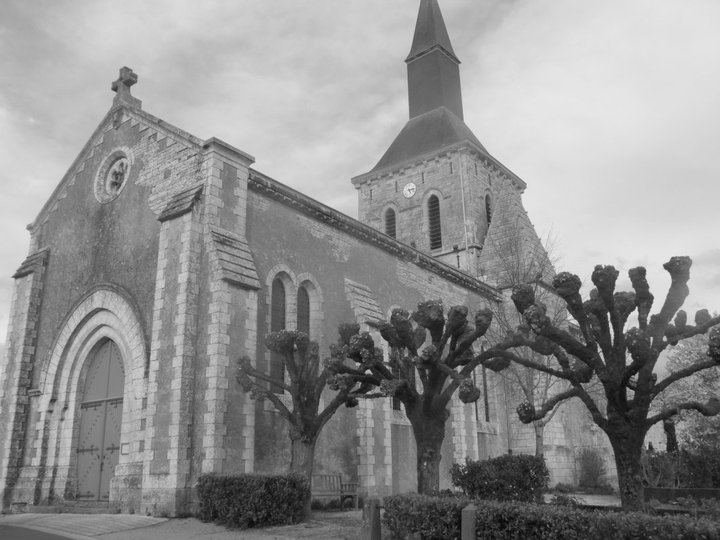
- The church of Saint-Pierre and Saint-Valérien
- Location of Saint-Valérien
- Location within France Location within Pays de la Loire
- Coordinates: 46°31′45″N 0°56′17″W
- Country: France
- Region: Pays de la Loire
- Department: Vendée
- Arrondissement: Fontenay-le-Comte
- Canton: La Châtaigneraie
- Intercommunality: Pays de Fontenay-Vendée

Government
  - Mayor (2020–2026): Cécile Boucher
- Area^{1}: 14.30 km^{2} (5.52 sq mi)
- Highest elevation: 74 m (243 ft)
- Lowest elevation: 32 m (105 ft)
- Population (2023): 557
  - Density: 39.0/km^{2} (101/sq mi)
- Time zone: UTC+01:00 (CET)
  - Summer (DST): UTC+02:00 (CEST)
- INSEE/Postal code: 85274 /85570
- ^{1} French Land Register data, which excludes lakes, ponds, glaciers > 1 km^{2} (0.386 sq mi or 247 acres) and river estuaries.

Saint-Valérien (French pronunciation: [sɛ̃ valeʁjɛ̃]) is a commune in the Vendée department in the Pays de la Loire region in western France.

== Geography ==
The river Smagne forms all of the commune's northern border.

== See also ==
- Communes of the Vendée department
