= Marsais-Sainte-Radégonde =

- Commune
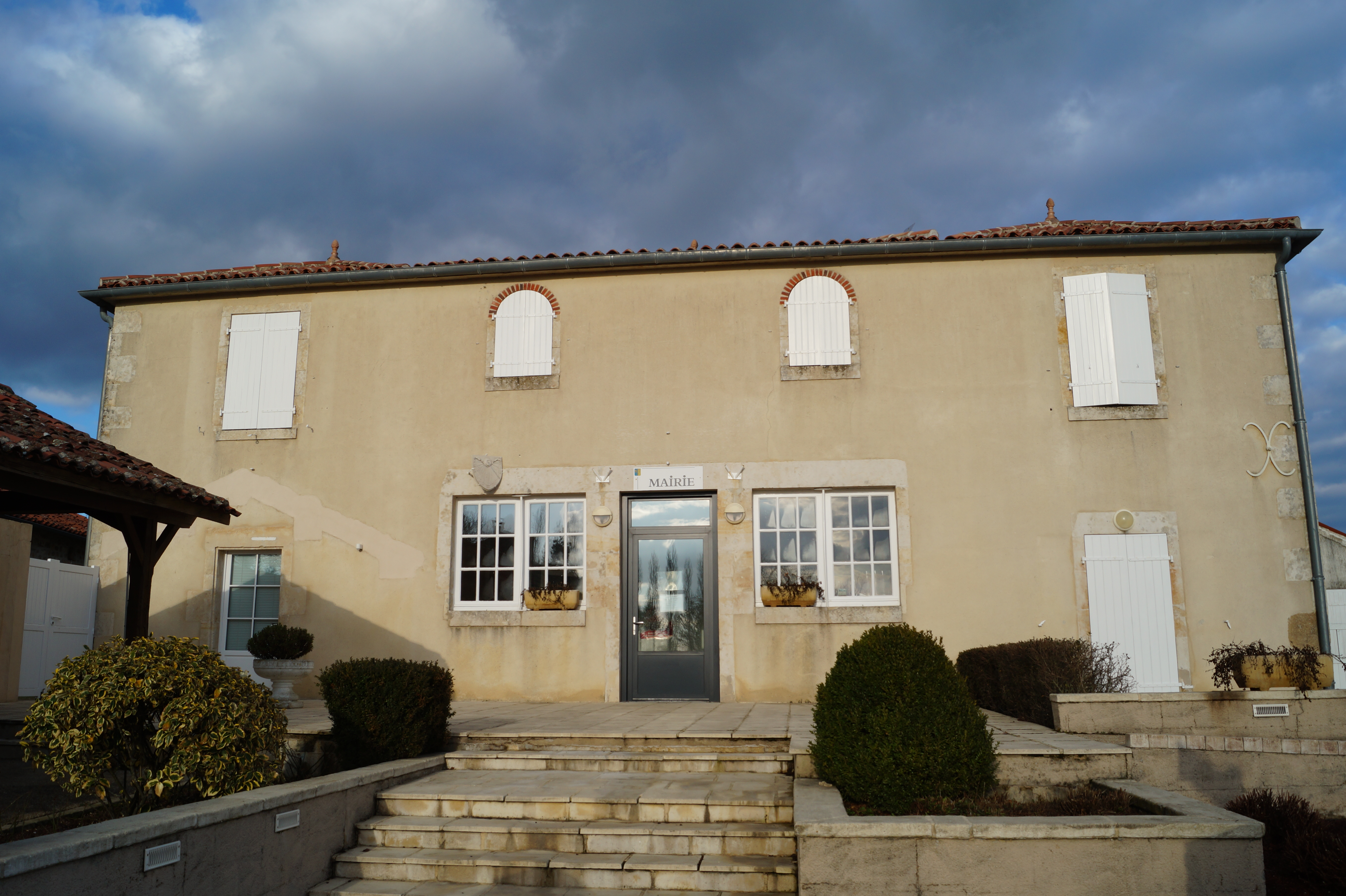
- Town hall

- Coat of arms
- Location of Marsais-Sainte-Radégonde
- Location within France Location within Pays de la Loire
- Coordinates: 46°32′21″N 0°52′48″W
- Country: France
- Region: Pays de la Loire
- Department: Vendée
- Arrondissement: Fontenay-le-Comte
- Canton: La Châtaigneraie
- Intercommunality: Pays de Fontenay-Vendée

Government
  - Mayor (2020–2026): Marie-Thérèse Fromaget
- Area^{1}: 14.77 km^{2} (5.70 sq mi)
- Highest elevation: 98 m (322 ft)
- Lowest elevation: 34 m (112 ft)
- Population (2023): 553
  - Density: 37.4/km^{2} (97.0/sq mi)
- Time zone: UTC+01:00 (CET)
  - Summer (DST): UTC+02:00 (CEST)
- INSEE/Postal code: 85137 /85570
- ^{1} French Land Register data, which excludes lakes, ponds, glaciers > 1 km^{2} (0.386 sq mi or 247 acres) and river estuaries.

Marsais-Sainte-Radégonde is a commune in the Vendée department in the Pays de la Loire region in western France.

== Geography ==
The river Smagne forms all of the commune's northern border.

== See also ==
- Communes of the Vendée department
