= La Châtaigneraie =

- Commune
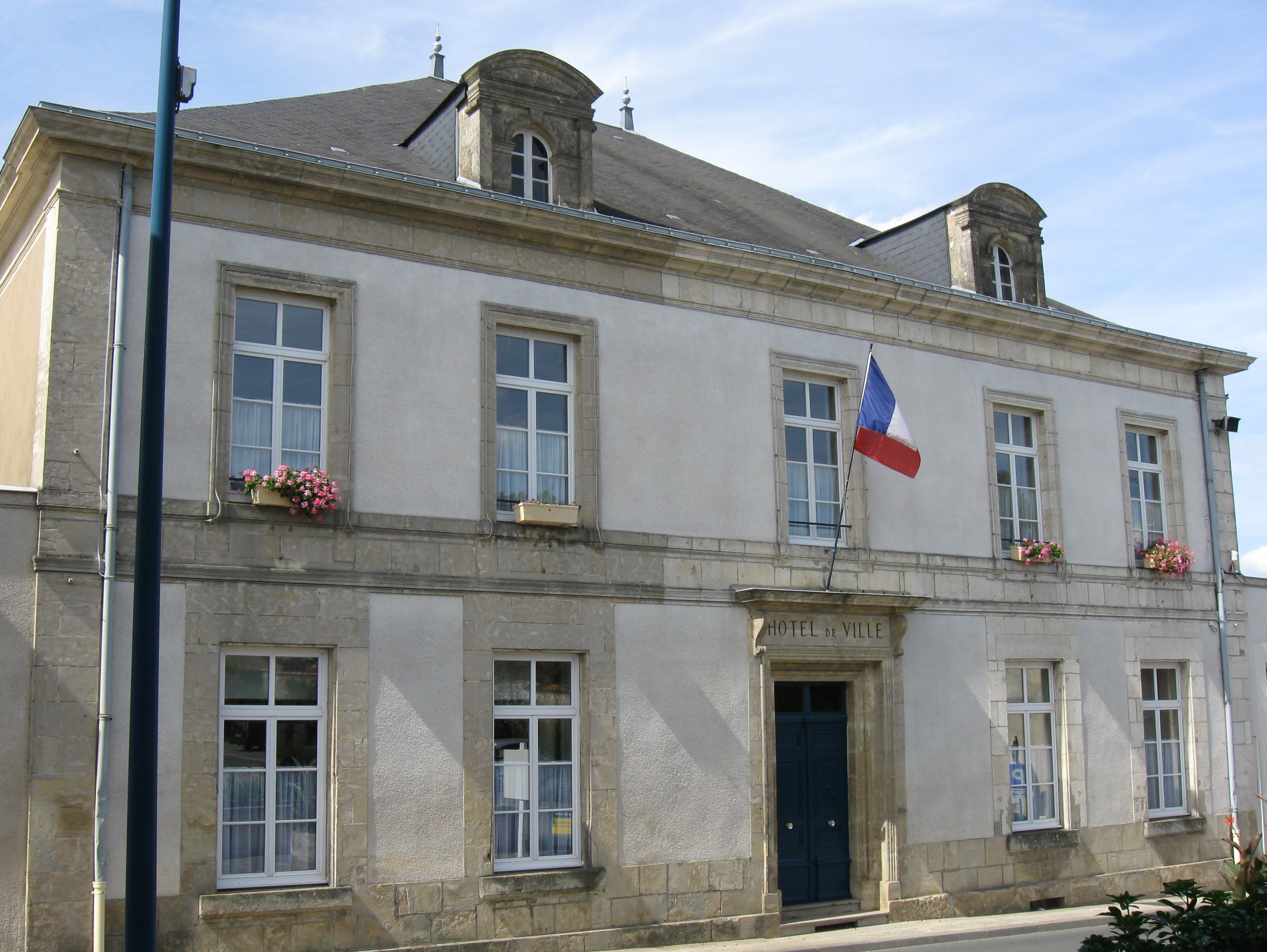

- Coat of arms
- Location of La Châtaigneraie
- Location within France Location within Pays de la Loire
- Coordinates: 46°39′00″N 0°44′21″W
- Country: France
- Region: Pays de la Loire
- Department: Vendée
- Arrondissement: Fontenay-le-Comte
- Canton: La Châtaigneraie
- Intercommunality: Pays de la Châtaigneraie

Government
  - Mayor (2023–2026): Marie-Michelle Chaigneau
- Area^{1}: 7.94 km^{2} (3.07 sq mi)
- Elevation: 172 m (564 ft)
- Highest elevation: 177 m (581 ft)
- Lowest elevation: 77 m (253 ft)
- Population (2023): 2,600
  - Density: 330/km^{2} (850/sq mi)
- Time zone: UTC+01:00 (CET)
  - Summer (DST): UTC+02:00 (CEST)
- INSEE/Postal code: 85059 /85120
- ^{1} French Land Register data, which excludes lakes, ponds, glaciers > 1 km^{2} (0.386 sq mi or 247 acres) and river estuaries.

For the school, see La Châtaigneraie (School)

La Châtaigneraie (French pronunciation: [la ʃatɛɲʁɛ]) is a commune of the Vendée department in the Pays de la Loire region in western France.

It lies halfway between Nantes-Poitiers-Angers, about an hour from the beaches of Les Sables d'Olonne. Located on the sunny side of the Gatines hills, it is greatly attached to its past and values.

== Population ==
Historical population
Year	Pop.	±% p.a.
1968	2,371	—
1975	2,906	+2.95%
1982	3,055	+0.72%
1990	2,904	−0.63%
1999	2,762	−0.56%
2007	2,624	−0.64%
2012	2,662	+0.29%
2017	2,544	−0.90%
2023	2,600	+0.36%
Source: INSEE

== See also ==
- Communes of the Vendée department
