= Saint-Cyr-des-Gâts =

- Commune
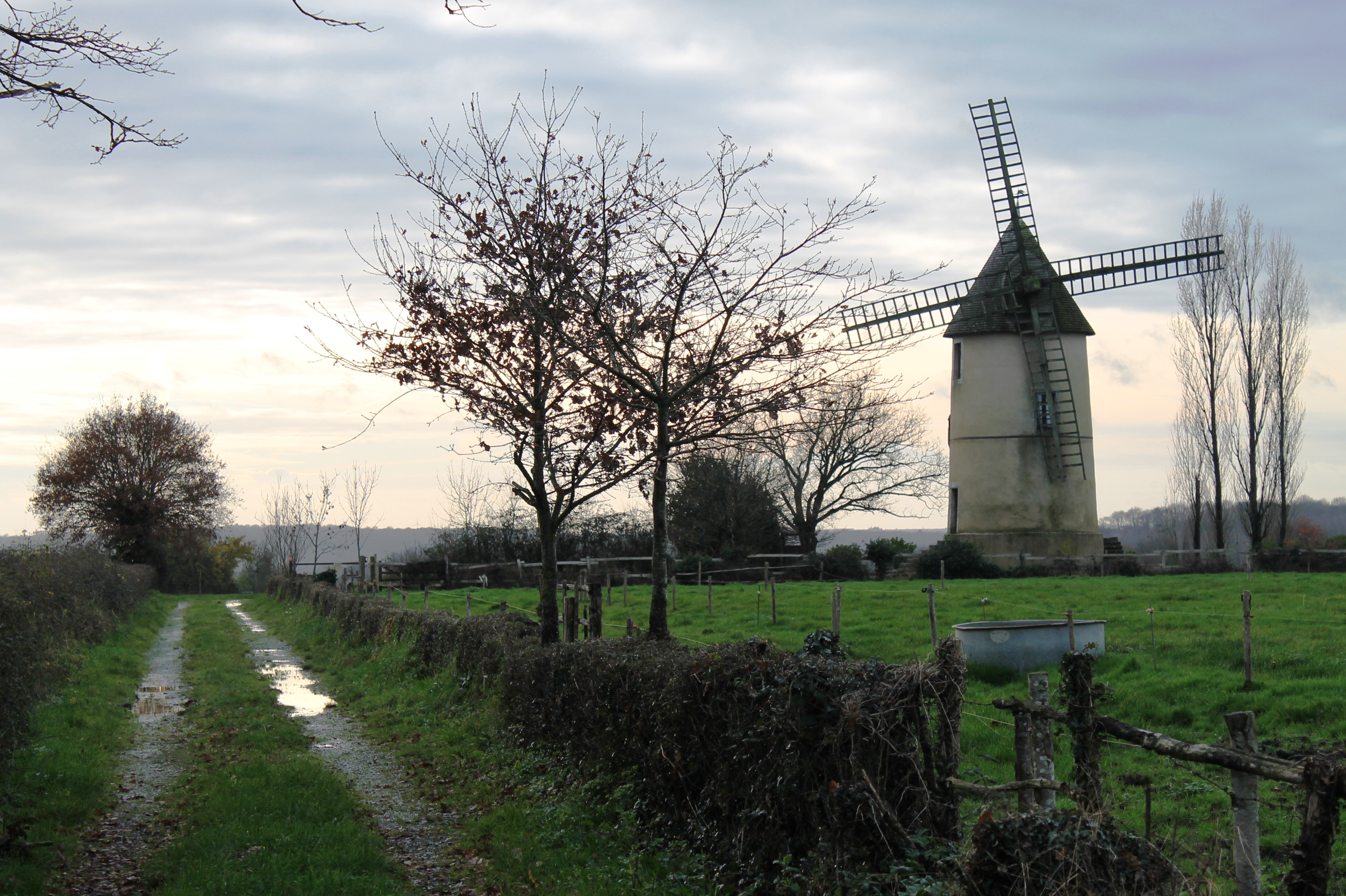
- The windmill in Saint-Cyr-des-Gâts
- Location of Saint-Cyr-des-Gâts
- Location within France Location within Pays de la Loire
- Coordinates: 46°34′12″N 0°53′00″W
- Country: France
- Region: Pays de la Loire
- Department: Vendée
- Arrondissement: Fontenay-le-Comte
- Canton: La Châtaigneraie
- Intercommunality: Pays de Fontenay-Vendée

Government
  - Mayor (2020–2026): Francis Riviere
- Area^{1}: 21.08 km^{2} (8.14 sq mi)
- Highest elevation: 132 m (433 ft)
- Lowest elevation: 49 m (161 ft)
- Population (2023): 533
  - Density: 25.3/km^{2} (65.5/sq mi)
- Time zone: UTC+01:00 (CET)
  - Summer (DST): UTC+02:00 (CEST)
- INSEE/Postal code: 85205 /85410
- ^{1} French Land Register data, which excludes lakes, ponds, glaciers > 1 km^{2} (0.386 sq mi or 247 acres) and river estuaries.

Saint-Cyr-des-Gâts (French pronunciation: [sɛ̃ siʁ de ɡa]) is a commune in the Vendée department in the Pays de la Loire region in western France.

== Geography ==
The river Smagne forms all of the commune's southern border.

== See also ==
- Communes of the Vendée department
