= Saint-Laurent-de-la-Salle =

- Commune
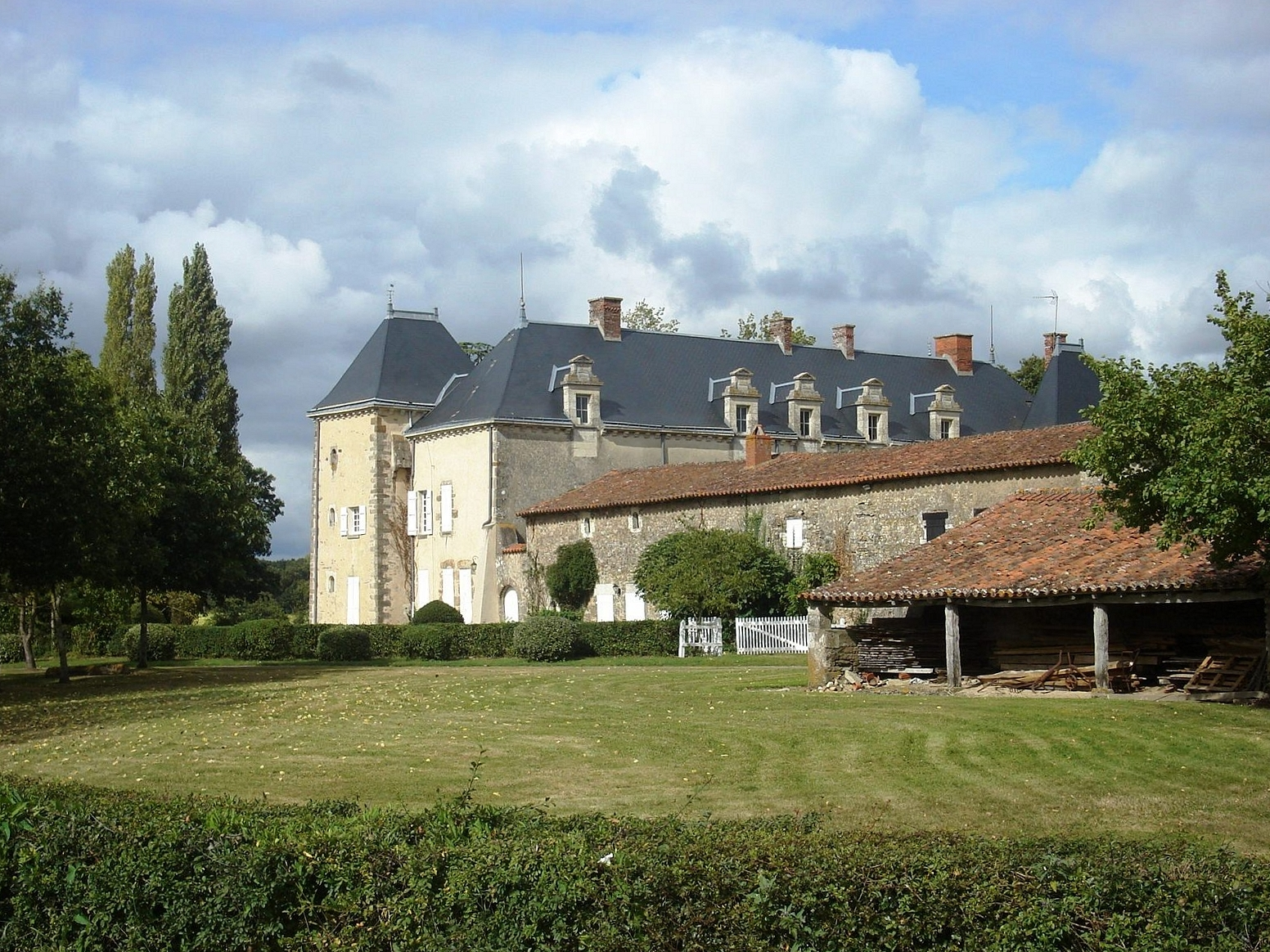
- The Château of Plessis-le-Franc, in Saint-Laurent-de-la-Salle
- Location of Saint-Laurent-de-la-Salle
- Location within France Location within Pays de la Loire
- Coordinates: 46°34′11″N 0°54′59″W
- Country: France
- Region: Pays de la Loire
- Department: Vendée
- Arrondissement: Fontenay-le-Comte
- Canton: La Châtaigneraie

Government
  - Mayor (2020–2026): Sébastien Roy
- Area^{1}: 19.22 km^{2} (7.42 sq mi)
- Highest elevation: 136 m (446 ft)
- Lowest elevation: 37 m (121 ft)
- Population (2023): 398
  - Density: 20.7/km^{2} (53.6/sq mi)
- Time zone: UTC+01:00 (CET)
  - Summer (DST): UTC+02:00 (CEST)
- INSEE/Postal code: 85237 /85410
- ^{1} French Land Register data, which excludes lakes, ponds, glaciers > 1 km^{2} (0.386 sq mi or 247 acres) and river estuaries.

Saint-Laurent-de-la-Salle (French pronunciation: [sɛ̃ loʁɑ̃ də la sal]) is a commune in the Vendée department in the Pays de la Loire region in western France.

== Geography ==
The river Smagne forms all of the commune's southern border.

== See also ==
- Communes of the Vendée department
