= Bourneau =

- Commune
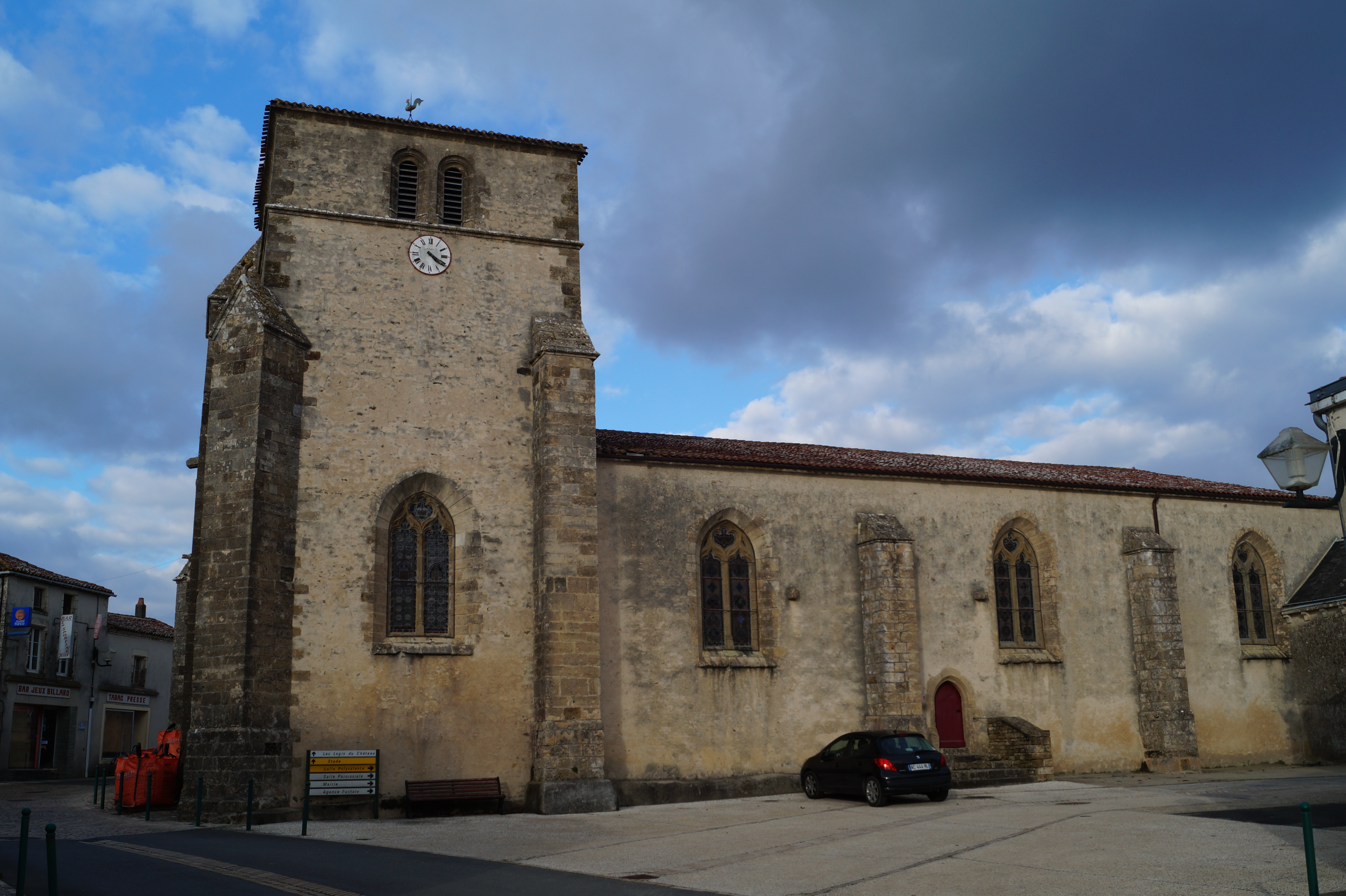
- Location of Bourneau
- Location within France Location within Pays de la Loire
- Coordinates: 46°32′25″N 0°48′59″W
- Country: France
- Region: Pays de la Loire
- Department: Vendée
- Arrondissement: Fontenay-le-Comte
- Canton: La Châtaigneraie

Government
  - Mayor (2020–2026): Gérard Guignard
- Area^{1}: 16.36 km^{2} (6.32 sq mi)
- Highest elevation: 122 m (400 ft)
- Lowest elevation: 38 m (125 ft)
- Population (2023): 710
  - Density: 43/km^{2} (110/sq mi)
- Time zone: UTC+01:00 (CET)
  - Summer (DST): UTC+02:00 (CEST)
- INSEE/Postal code: 85033 /85200
- ^{1} French Land Register data, which excludes lakes, ponds, glaciers > 1 km^{2} (0.386 sq mi or 247 acres) and river estuaries.

Bourneau (French pronunciation: [buʁno]) is a commune in the Vendée department in the Pays de la Loire region in western France.

== Geography ==
The river Smagne has its source in the commune.

== See also ==
- Communes of the Vendée department
