= Puy-de-Serre =

- Commune
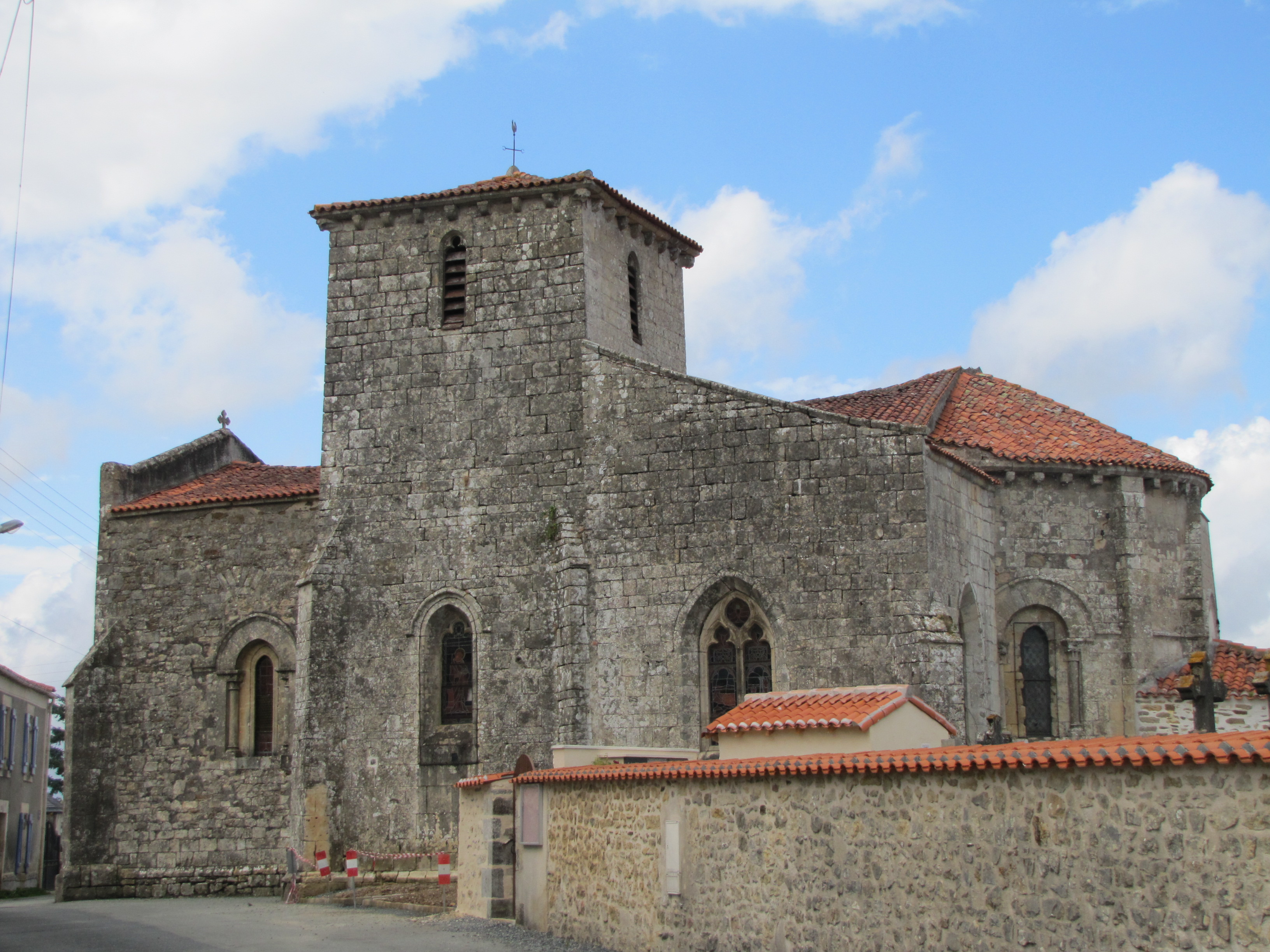
- The church of Saint-Loup, in Puy-de-Serre
- Location of Puy-de-Serre
- Location within France Location within Pays de la Loire
- Coordinates: 46°33′47″N 0°39′56″W
- Country: France
- Region: Pays de la Loire
- Department: Vendée
- Arrondissement: Fontenay-le-Comte
- Canton: Fontenay-le-Comte
- Intercommunality: Vendée Sèvre Autise

Government
  - Mayor (2020–2026): Catherine Masson-Soulard
- Area^{1}: 13.81 km^{2} (5.33 sq mi)
- Highest elevation: 124 m (407 ft)
- Lowest elevation: 58 m (190 ft)
- Population (2023): 311
  - Density: 22.5/km^{2} (58.3/sq mi)
- Time zone: UTC+01:00 (CET)
  - Summer (DST): UTC+02:00 (CEST)
- INSEE/Postal code: 85184 /85240
- ^{1} French Land Register data, which excludes lakes, ponds, glaciers > 1 km^{2} (0.386 sq mi or 247 acres) and river estuaries.

Puy-de-Serre (French pronunciation: [pɥi də sɛʁ]) is a commune in the Vendée department in the Pays de la Loire region in western France.

== See also ==
- Communes of the Vendée department
