= Canton of La Châtaigneraie =

Coordinates: 46.65°N 0.74°W

The canton of La Châtaigneraie is an administrative division of the Vendée department, western France. Its borders were modified at the French canton reorganisation which came into effect in March 2015. Its seat is in La Châtaigneraie.

It consists of the following communes:

1. Antigny
2. Bazoges-en-Pareds
3. Bourneau
4. La Caillère-Saint-Hilaire
5. La Chapelle-Thémer
6. La Châtaigneraie
7. Cheffois
8. L'Hermenault
9. La Jaudonnière
10. Loge-Fougereuse
11. Marillet
12. Marsais-Sainte-Radégonde
13. Menomblet
14. Mouilleron-Saint-Germain
15. Petosse
16. La Réorthe
17. Rives-du-Fougerais
18. Saint-Aubin-la-Plaine
19. Saint-Cyr-des-Gâts
20. Saint-Étienne-de-Brillouet
21. Saint-Hilaire-de-Voust
22. Saint-Jean-d'Hermine
23. Saint-Juire-Champgillon
24. Saint-Laurent-de-la-Salle
25. Saint-Martin-des-Fontaines
26. Saint-Martin-Lars-en-Sainte-Hermine
27. Saint-Maurice-des-Noues
28. Saint-Maurice-le-Girard
29. Saint-Pierre-du-Chemin
30. Saint-Valérien
31. Sérigné
32. Terval
33. Thiré
34. Vouvant
