= Arrondissement of Fontenay-le-Comte =

Coordinates: 46.47°N 0.82°W

Fontenay-le-Comte
- Arrondissement
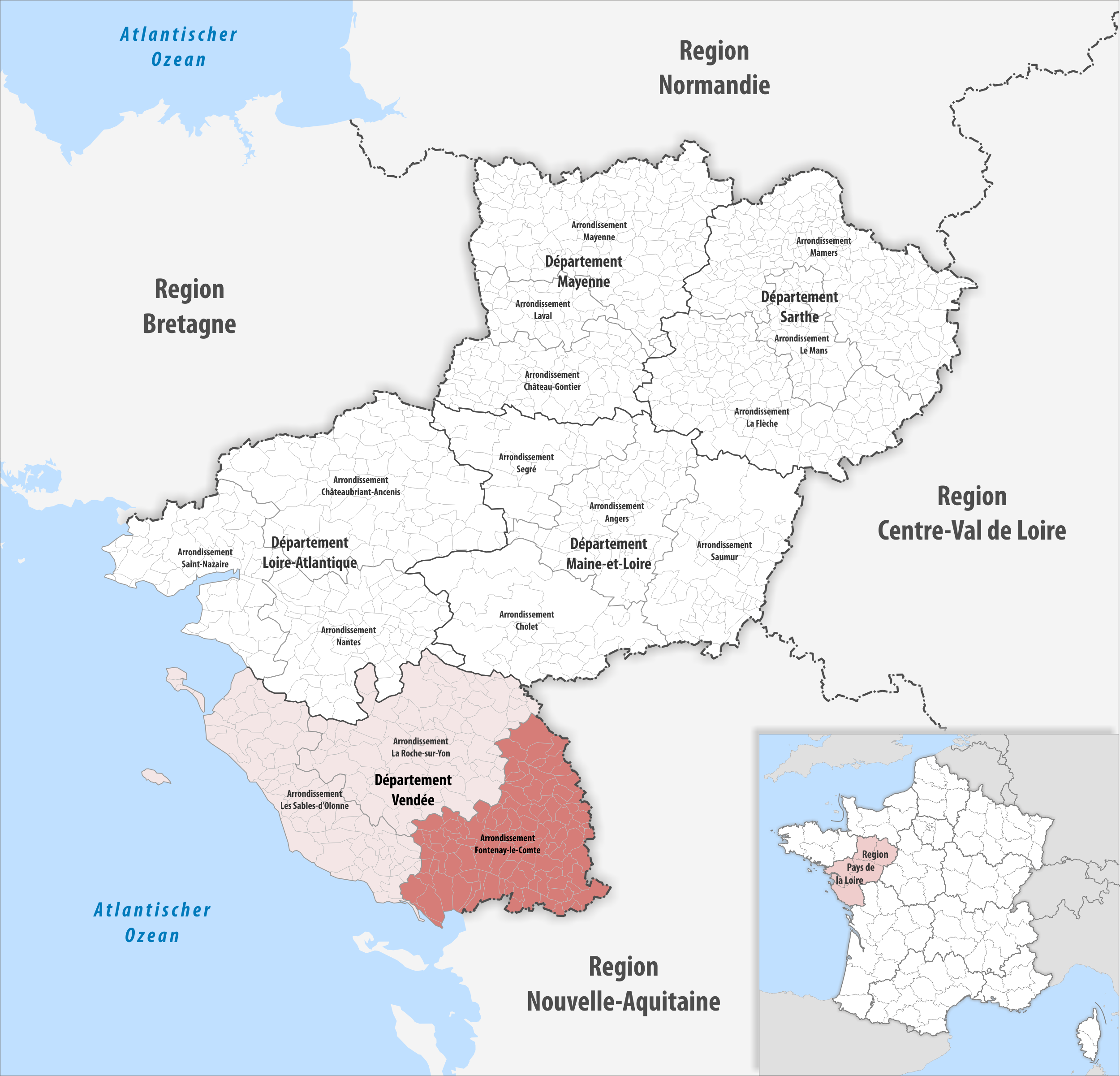
- Location within the region Pays de la Loire
- Country: France
- Region: Pays de la Loire
- Department: Vendée
- No. of communes: {{{nbcomm}}}
- Area: 2,315.8 km^{2} (894.1 sq mi)
- Population (2023): 141,137
  - Density: 60.945/km^{2} (157.85/sq mi)
- INSEE code: 851

The arrondissement of Fontenay-le-Comte is an arrondissement of France in the Vendée department in the Pays de la Loire region. It has 104 communes. Its population is 139,706 (2021), and its area is 2,315.8 km^{2} (894.1 sq mi).

== Composition ==
The communes of the arrondissement of Fontenay-le-Comte, and their INSEE codes, are:

1. Antigny (85005)
2. Auchay-sur-Vendée (85009)
3. Bazoges-en-Pareds (85014)
4. Benet (85020)
5. Bessay (85023)
6. Bouillé-Courdault (85028)
7. Le Boupère (85031)
8. Bourneau (85033)
9. La Bretonnière-la-Claye (85036)
10. La Caillère-Saint-Hilaire (85040)
11. Chaillé-les-Marais (85042)
12. Champagné-les-Marais (85049)
13. La Chapelle-Thémer (85056)
14. Chasnais (85058)
15. La Châtaigneraie (85059)
16. Château-Guibert (85061)
17. Chavagnes-les-Redoux (85066)
18. Cheffois (85067)
19. Corpe (85073)
20. La Couture (85074)
21. Damvix (85078)
22. Doix-lès-Fontaines (85080)
23. Faymoreau (85087)
24. Fontenay-le-Comte (85092)
25. Foussais-Payré (85094)
26. Grues (85104)
27. Le Gué-de-Velluire (85105)
28. L'Hermenault (85110)
29. L'Île-d'Elle (85111)
30. La Jaudonnière (85115)
31. Lairoux (85117)
32. Le Langon (85121)
33. Liez (85123)
34. Loge-Fougereuse (85125)
35. Longèves (85126)
36. Luçon (85128)
37. Les Magnils-Reigniers (85131)
38. Maillé (85132)
39. Maillezais (85133)
40. Mareuil-sur-Lay-Dissais (85135)
41. Marillet (85136)
42. Marsais-Sainte-Radégonde (85137)
43. Le Mazeau (85139)
44. La Meilleraie-Tillay (85140)
45. Menomblet (85141)
46. Mervent (85143)
47. Monsireigne (85145)
48. Montournais (85147)
49. Montreuil (85148)
50. Moreilles (85149)
51. Mouilleron-Saint-Germain (85154)
52. Moutiers-sur-le-Lay (85157)
53. Mouzeuil-Saint-Martin (85158)
54. Nalliers (85159)
55. L'Orbrie (85167)
56. Péault (85171)
57. Petosse (85174)
58. Les Pineaux (85175)
59. Pissotte (85176)
60. Pouillé (85181)
61. Pouzauges (85182)
62. Puy-de-Serre (85184)
63. Puyravault (85185)
64. Réaumur (85187)
65. La Réorthe (85188)
66. Rives-d'Autise (85162)
67. Rives-du-Fougerais (85292)
68. Rosnay (85193)
69. Saint-Aubin-la-Plaine (85199)
70. Saint-Cyr-des-Gâts (85205)
71. Saint-Denis-du-Payré (85207)
72. Sainte-Gemme-la-Plaine (85216)
73. Sainte-Pexine (85261)
74. Sainte-Radégonde-des-Noyers (85267)
75. Saint-Étienne-de-Brillouet (85209)
76. Saint-Hilaire-des-Loges (85227)
77. Saint-Hilaire-de-Voust (85229)
78. Saint-Jean-d'Hermine (85223)
79. Saint-Juire-Champgillon (85235)
80. Saint-Laurent-de-la-Salle (85237)
81. Saint-Martin-de-Fraigneau (85244)
82. Saint-Martin-des-Fontaines (85245)
83. Saint-Martin-Lars-en-Sainte-Hermine (85248)
84. Saint-Maurice-des-Noues (85251)
85. Saint-Maurice-le-Girard (85252)
86. Saint-Mesmin (85254)
87. Saint-Michel-en-l'Herm (85255)
88. Saint-Michel-le-Cloucq (85256)
89. Saint-Pierre-du-Chemin (85264)
90. Saint-Pierre-le-Vieux (85265)
91. Saint-Sigismond (85269)
92. Saint-Valérien (85274)
93. Sérigné (85281)
94. Sèvremont (85090)
95. La Taillée (85286)
96. Tallud-Sainte-Gemme (85287)
97. Terval (85289)
98. Thiré (85290)
99. Triaize (85297)
100. Les Velluire-sur-Vendée (85177)
101. Vix (85303)
102. Vouillé-les-Marais (85304)
103. Vouvant (85305)
104. Xanton-Chassenon (85306)

== History ==
The arrondissement of Fontenay-le-Comte was created in 1811. At the January 2017 reorganisation of the arrondissements of Vendée, it received 11 communes from the arrondissement of La Roche-sur-Yon.

As a result of the reorganisation of the cantons of France which came into effect in 2015, the borders of the cantons are no longer related to the borders of the arrondissements. The cantons of the arrondissement of La Roche-sur-Yon were, as of January 2015:

1. Chaillé-les-Marais
2. La Châtaigneraie
3. Fontenay-le-Comte
4. L'Hermenault
5. Luçon
6. Maillezais
7. Pouzauges
8. Sainte-Hermine
9. Saint-Hilaire-des-Loges

== Sub-prefects ==
- Pierre-Henry Maccioni : 1970-1972
