= Saint-Martin-de-Fraigneau =

- Commune
- Location of Saint-Martin-de-Fraigneau
- Location within France Location within Pays de la Loire
- Coordinates: 46°26′08″N 0°44′38″W
- Country: France
- Region: Pays de la Loire
- Department: Vendée
- Arrondissement: Fontenay-le-Comte
- Canton: Fontenay-le-Comte
- Intercommunality: Pays de Fontenay-Vendée

Government
  - Mayor (2020–2026): Michel Pouzet
- Area^{1}: 13.56 km^{2} (5.24 sq mi)
- Highest elevation: 37 m (121 ft)
- Lowest elevation: 10 m (33 ft)
- Population (2023): 795
  - Density: 58.6/km^{2} (152/sq mi)
- Time zone: UTC+01:00 (CET)
  - Summer (DST): UTC+02:00 (CEST)
- INSEE/Postal code: 85244 /85200
- ^{1} French Land Register data, which excludes lakes, ponds, glaciers > 1 km^{2} (0.386 sq mi or 247 acres) and river estuaries.

Saint-Martin-de-Fraigneau (French pronunciation: [sɛ̃ maʁtɛ̃ də fʁɛɲo]) is a commune in the Vendée department in the Pays de la Loire region in western France.

== See also ==
- Communes of the Vendée department
