= Saint-Hilaire-des-Loges =

- Commune
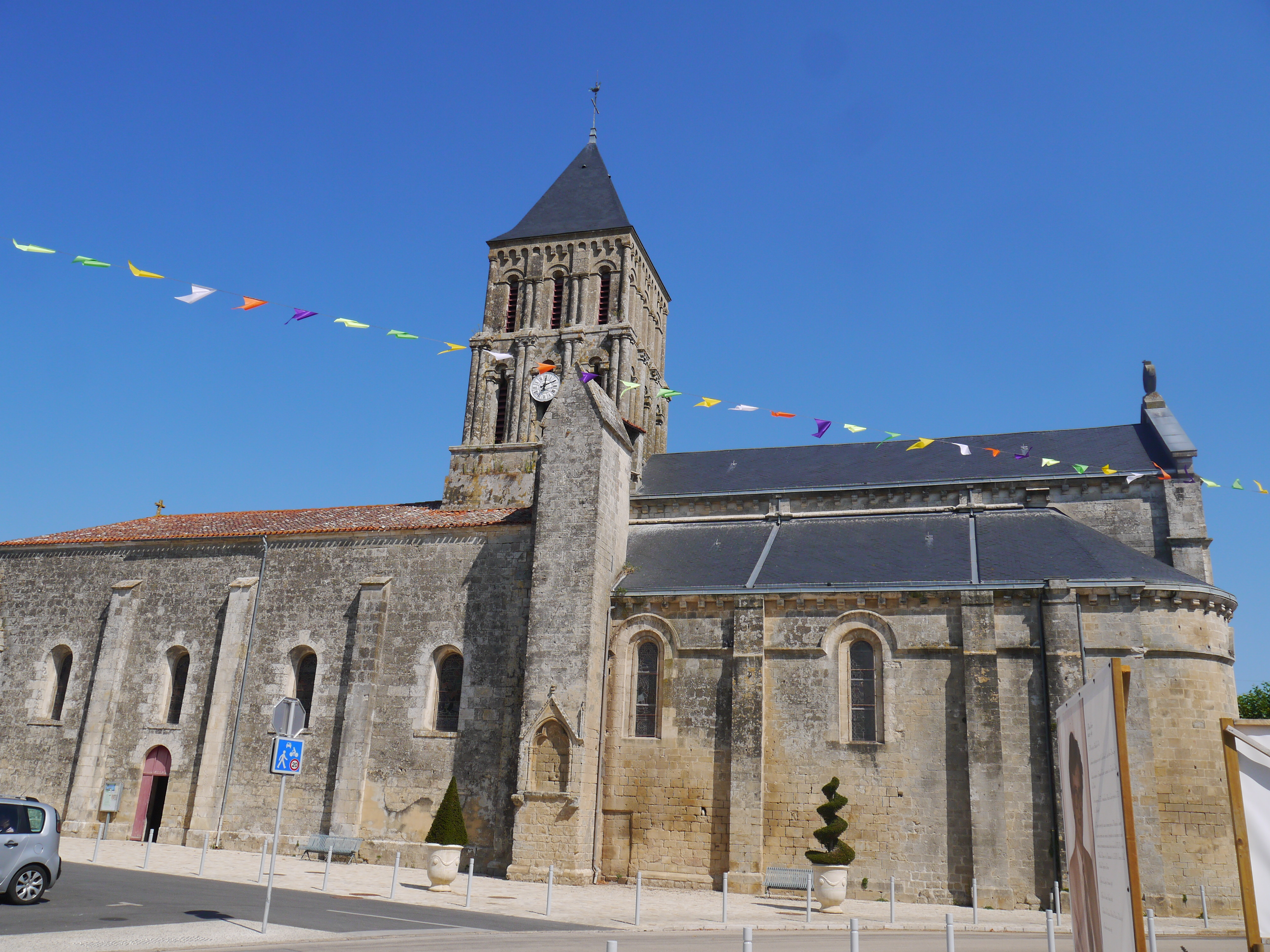
- Church of Saint-Hilaire in Saint-Hilaire-des-Loges

- Coat of arms
- Location of Saint-Hilaire-des-Loges
- Location within France Location within Pays de la Loire
- Coordinates: 46°28′21″N 0°39′50″W
- Country: France
- Region: Pays de la Loire
- Department: Vendée
- Arrondissement: Fontenay-le-Comte
- Canton: Fontenay-le-Comte
- Intercommunality: Vendée Sèvre Autise

Government
  - Mayor (2020–2026): Marie-Line Perrin
- Area^{1}: 35.20 km^{2} (13.59 sq mi)
- Highest elevation: 93 m (305 ft)
- Lowest elevation: 16 m (52 ft)
- Population (2023): 1,917
  - Density: 54.46/km^{2} (141.1/sq mi)
- Time zone: UTC+01:00 (CET)
  - Summer (DST): UTC+02:00 (CEST)
- INSEE/Postal code: 85227 /85240
- ^{1} French Land Register data, which excludes lakes, ponds, glaciers > 1 km^{2} (0.386 sq mi or 247 acres) and river estuaries.

Saint-Hilaire-des-Loges (French pronunciation: [sɛ̃.t‿ilɛʁ de lɔʒ]) is a commune in the Vendée department in the Pays de la Loire region in western France.

== See also ==
- Communes of the Vendée department
