= Saint-Maurice-des-Noues =

- Commune
- Coat of arms
- Location of Saint-Maurice-des-Noues
- Location within France Location within Pays de la Loire
- Coordinates: 46°36′11″N 0°43′19″W
- Country: France
- Region: Pays de la Loire
- Department: Vendée
- Arrondissement: Fontenay-le-Comte
- Canton: La Châtaigneraie
- Intercommunality: Pays de la Châtaigneraie

Government
  - Mayor (2020–2026): Christian Guenion
- Area^{1}: 21.42 km^{2} (8.27 sq mi)
- Highest elevation: 129 m (423 ft)
- Lowest elevation: 51 m (167 ft)
- Population (2023): 642
  - Density: 30.0/km^{2} (77.6/sq mi)
- Time zone: UTC+01:00 (CET)
  - Summer (DST): UTC+02:00 (CEST)
- INSEE/Postal code: 85251 /85120
- ^{1} French Land Register data, which excludes lakes, ponds, glaciers > 1 km^{2} (0.386 sq mi or 247 acres) and river estuaries.

Saint-Maurice-des-Noues (French pronunciation: [sɛ̃ mɔʁis de nu]) is a commune in the Vendée department in the Pays de la Loire region in western France.

== See also ==
- Communes of the Vendée department
