= Petosse =

- Commune
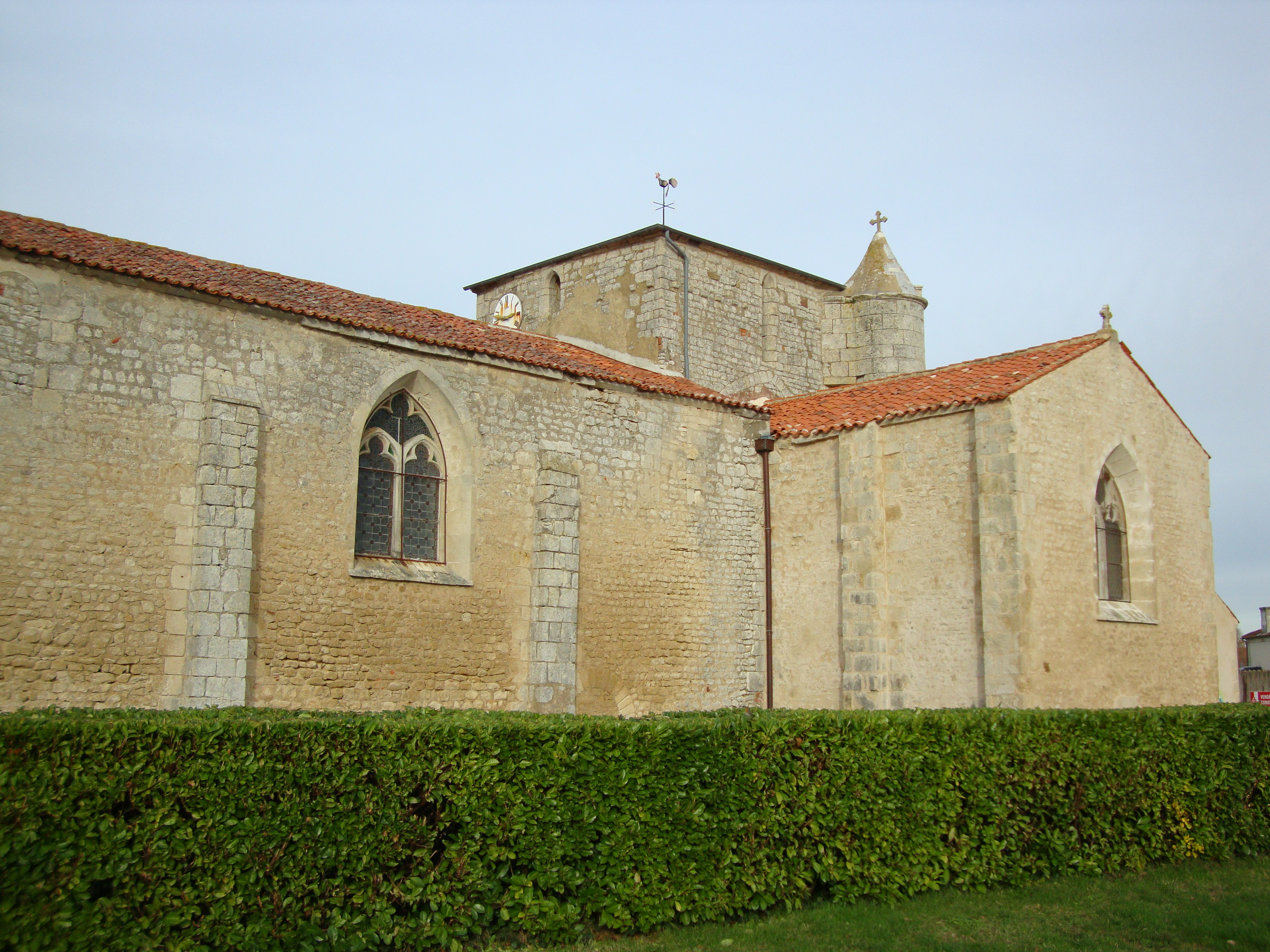
- The church of Saint-Julien, in Petosse
- Location of Petosse
- Location within France Location within Pays de la Loire
- Coordinates: 46°28′53″N 0°54′29″W
- Country: France
- Region: Pays de la Loire
- Department: Vendée
- Arrondissement: Fontenay-le-Comte
- Canton: La Châtaigneraie
- Intercommunality: Pays de Fontenay-Vendée

Government
  - Mayor (2020–2026): Yves-Marie Boucher
- Area^{1}: 15.90 km^{2} (6.14 sq mi)
- Highest elevation: 58 m (190 ft)
- Lowest elevation: 20 m (66 ft)
- Population (2023): 688
  - Density: 43.3/km^{2} (112/sq mi)
- Time zone: UTC+01:00 (CET)
  - Summer (DST): UTC+02:00 (CEST)
- INSEE/Postal code: 85174 /85570
- ^{1} French Land Register data, which excludes lakes, ponds, glaciers > 1 km^{2} (0.386 sq mi or 247 acres) and river estuaries.

Petosse (French pronunciation: [pətɔs]) is a commune in the Vendée department in the Pays de la Loire region in western France.

== See also ==
- Communes of the Vendée department
