= Mervent =

- Commune
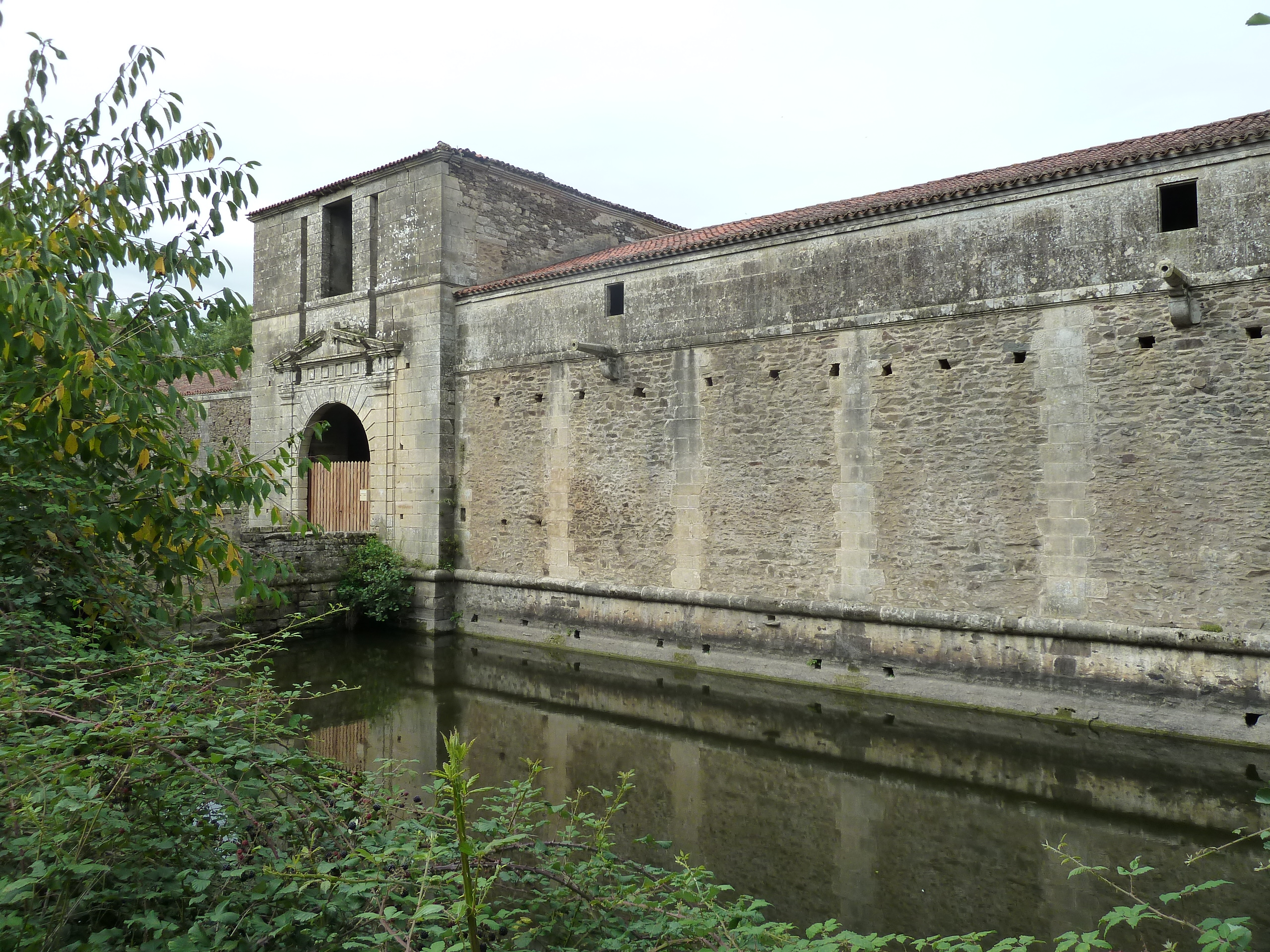
- The Château de la Citardière
- Location of Mervent
- Location within France Location within Pays de la Loire
- Coordinates: 46°31′23″N 0°45′19″W
- Country: France
- Region: Pays de la Loire
- Department: Vendée
- Arrondissement: Fontenay-le-Comte
- Canton: Fontenay-le-Comte

Government
  - Mayor (2020–2026): Joël Bobineau
- Area^{1}: 22.23 km^{2} (8.58 sq mi)
- Highest elevation: 112 m (367 ft)
- Lowest elevation: 13 m (43 ft)
- Population (2023): 1,063
  - Density: 47.82/km^{2} (123.8/sq mi)
- Time zone: UTC+01:00 (CET)
  - Summer (DST): UTC+02:00 (CEST)
- INSEE/Postal code: 85143 /85200
- ^{1} French Land Register data, which excludes lakes, ponds, glaciers > 1 km^{2} (0.386 sq mi or 247 acres) and river estuaries.

Mervent (French pronunciation: [mɛʁvɑ̃]) is a commune in the Vendée department in the Pays de la Loire region in western France.

== Population ==
Historical population
Year	Pop.	±% p.a.
1968	938	—
1975	844	−1.50%
1982	890	+0.76%
1990	1,023	+1.76%
1999	1,059	+0.39%
2007	1,079	+0.23%
2012	1,062	−0.32%
2017	1,050	−0.23%
2023	1,063	+0.21%
Source: INSEE

== Places and monuments ==
- The Château de la Citardière
- The Old Castle ruins in the village
- The church Saint-Medard
- The Mère river.
- The Mervent-Vouvant forest
- The Pierre-Brune recreation park
- The Natur'Zoo
- The cave where Louis de Montfort (an 18th-century catholic priest) prayed

== Main sights ==
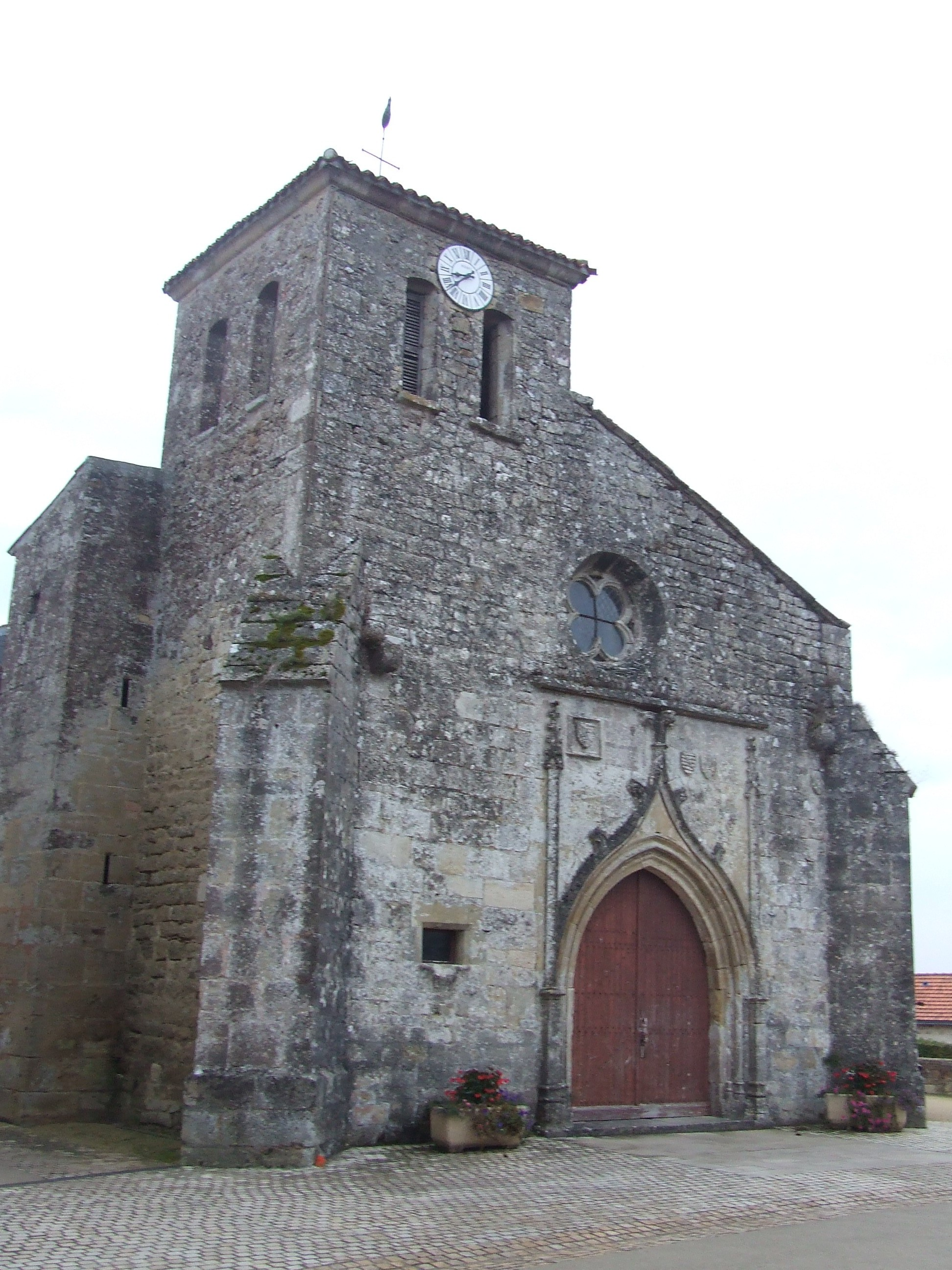
Mervent's church

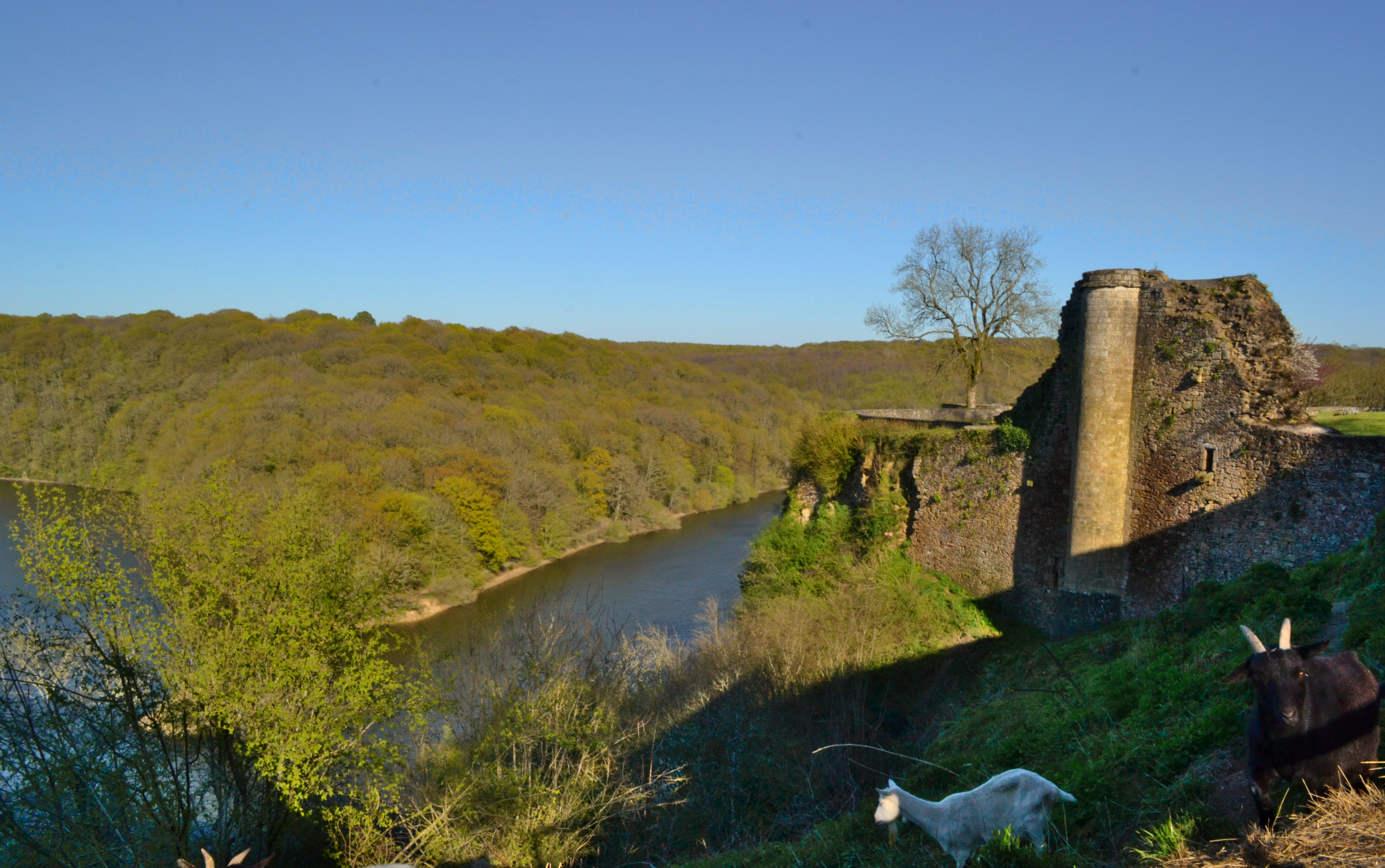
The forest

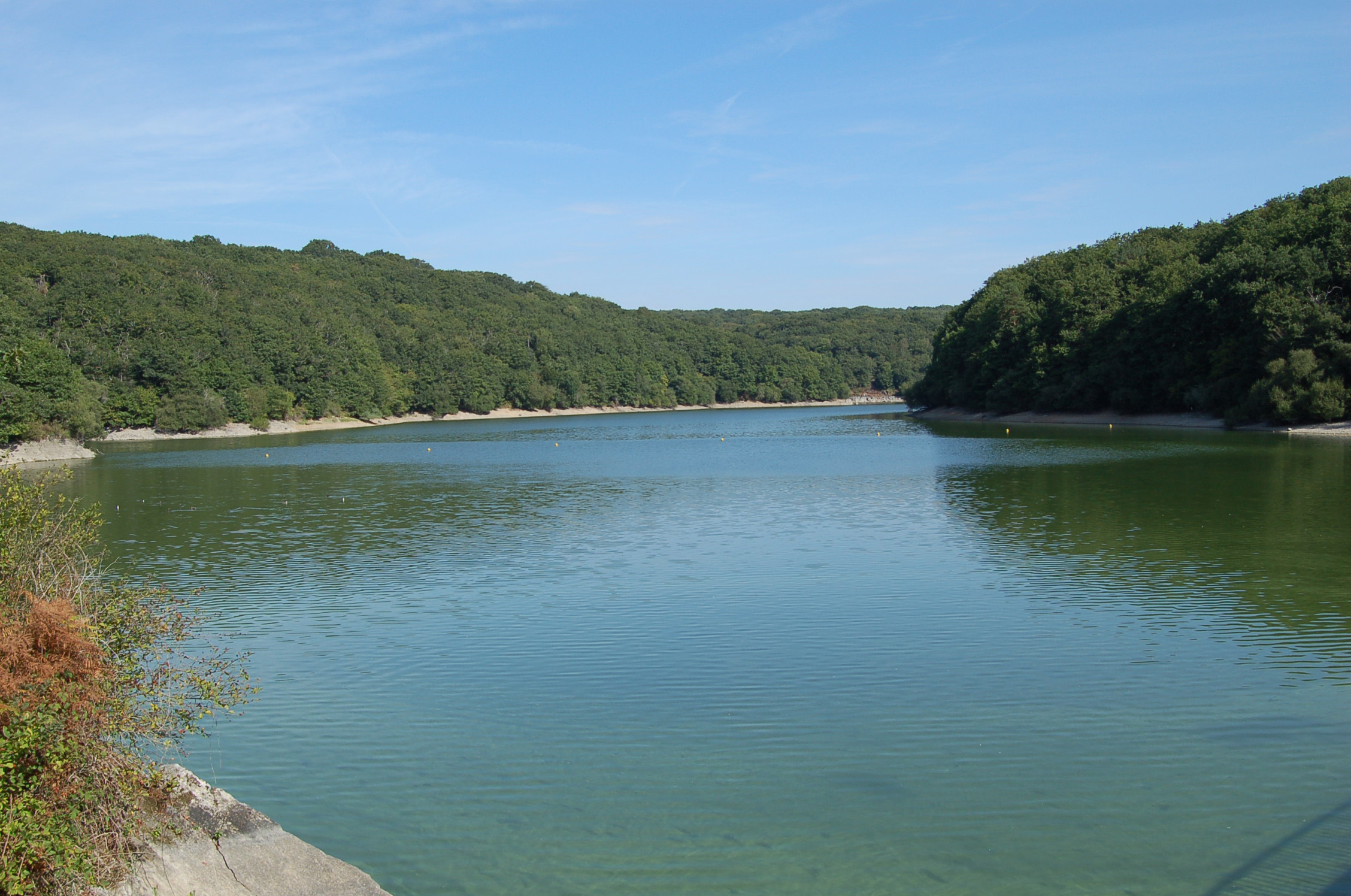
Mervent's lake

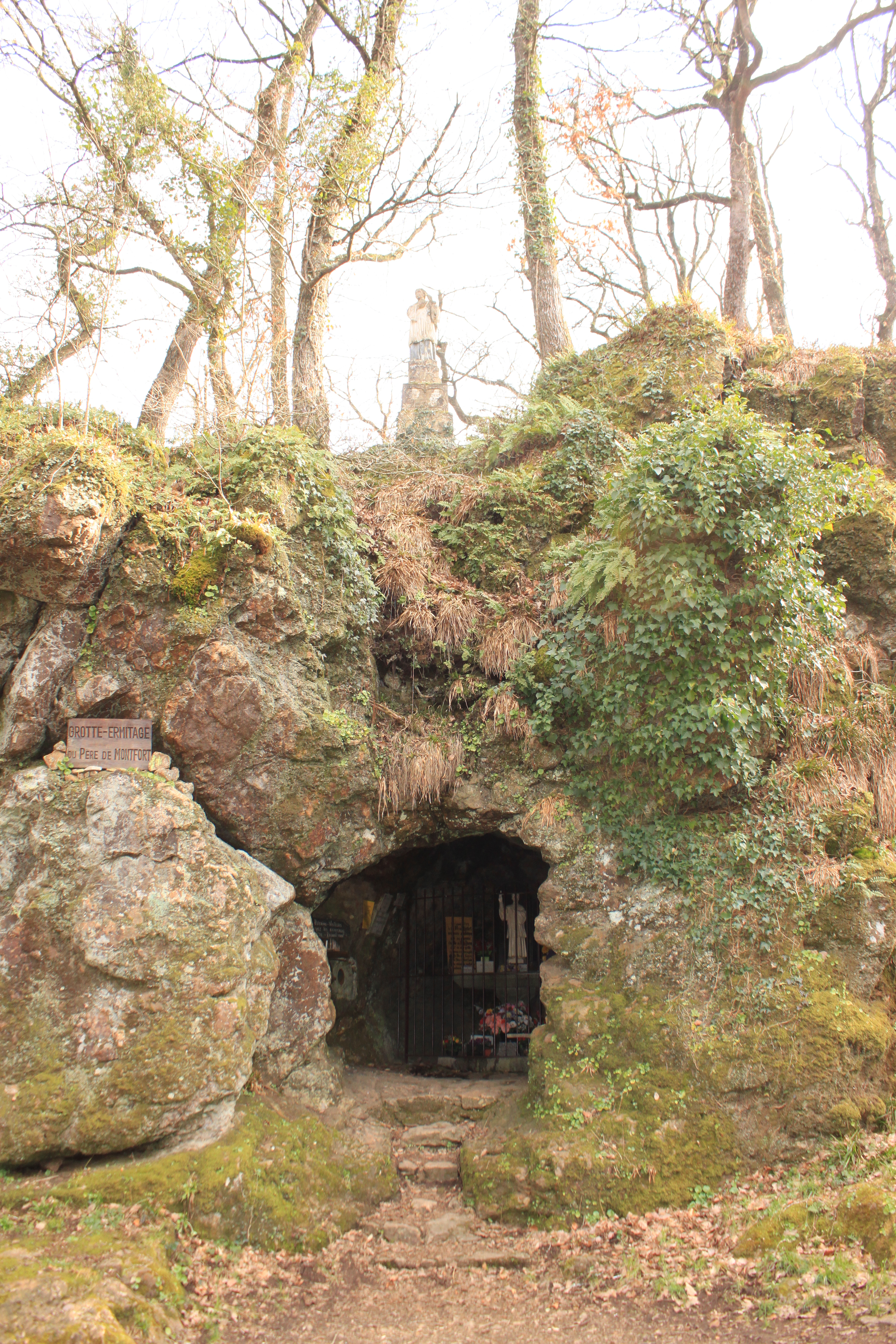
The cave of Louis de Monfort

== See also ==
- Communes of the Vendée department
