= Foussais-Payré =

- Commune
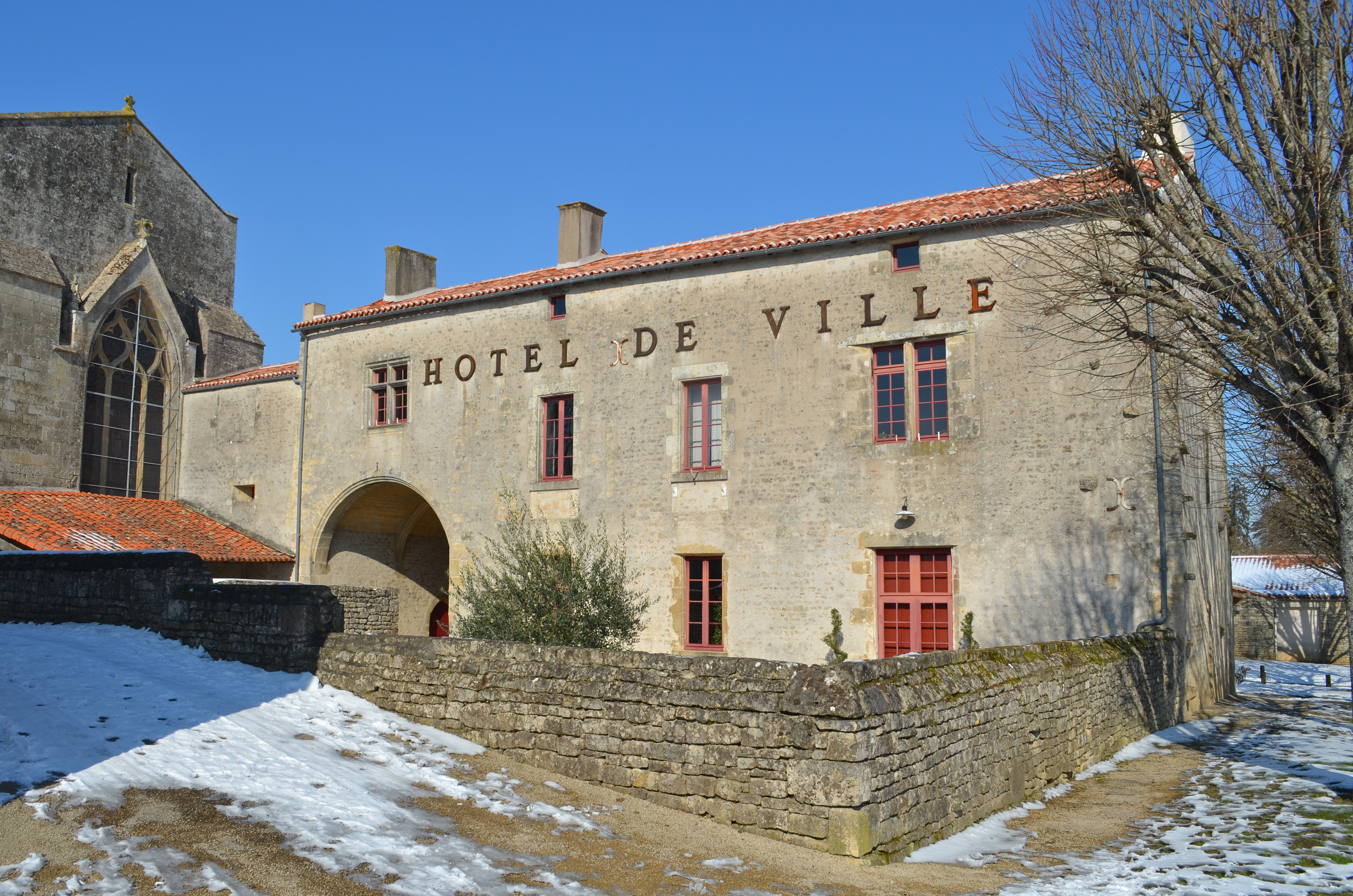
- The town hall in Foussais-Payré

- Coat of arms
- Location of Foussais-Payré
- Location within France Location within Pays de la Loire
- Coordinates: 46°31′52″N 0°40′58″W
- Country: France
- Region: Pays de la Loire
- Department: Vendée
- Arrondissement: Fontenay-le-Comte
- Canton: Fontenay-le-Comte
- Intercommunality: Pays de Fontenay-Vendée

Government
  - Mayor (2020–2026): Jean-Marie Arnaudeau
- Area^{1}: 34.42 km^{2} (13.29 sq mi)
- Highest elevation: 117 m (384 ft)
- Lowest elevation: 38 m (125 ft)
- Population (2023): 1,168
  - Density: 33.93/km^{2} (87.89/sq mi)
- Time zone: UTC+01:00 (CET)
  - Summer (DST): UTC+02:00 (CEST)
- INSEE/Postal code: 85094 /85240
- ^{1} French Land Register data, which excludes lakes, ponds, glaciers > 1 km^{2} (0.386 sq mi or 247 acres) and river estuaries.

Foussais-Payré (French pronunciation: [fusɛ pɛʁe]) is a commune in the Vendée department in the Pays de la Loire region in western France.

== See also ==
- Communes of the Vendée department
