= Saint-Martin-Lars-en-Sainte-Hermine =

- Commune
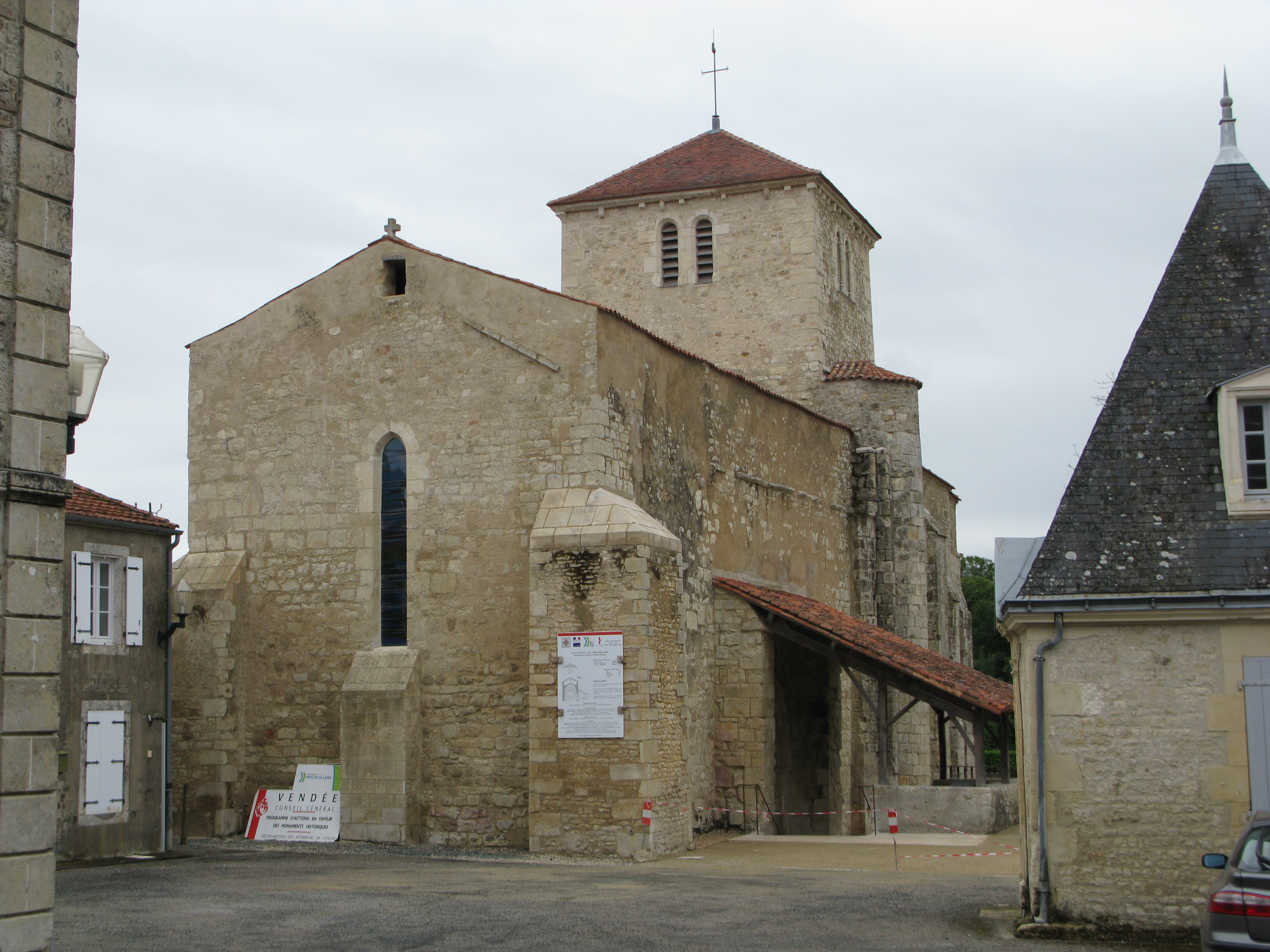
- The church in Saint-Martin-Lars en Sainte-Hermine
- Location of Saint-Martin-Lars-en-Sainte-Hermine
- Location within France Location within Pays de la Loire
- Coordinates: 46°35′32″N 0°58′47″W
- Country: France
- Region: Pays de la Loire
- Department: Vendée
- Arrondissement: Fontenay-le-Comte
- Canton: La Châtaigneraie

Government
  - Mayor (2020–2026): Joseph-Marie Alletru
- Area^{1}: 18.81 km^{2} (7.26 sq mi)
- Highest elevation: 118 m (387 ft)
- Lowest elevation: 37 m (121 ft)
- Population (2023): 419
  - Density: 22.3/km^{2} (57.7/sq mi)
- Time zone: UTC+01:00 (CET)
  - Summer (DST): UTC+02:00 (CEST)
- INSEE/Postal code: 85248 /85210
- ^{1} French Land Register data, which excludes lakes, ponds, glaciers > 1 km^{2} (0.386 sq mi or 247 acres) and river estuaries.

Saint-Martin-Lars-en-Sainte-Hermine (French pronunciation: [sɛ̃ maʁtɛ̃ laʁ ɑ̃ sɛ̃t ɛʁmin]) is a commune in the Vendée department in the Pays de la Loire region in western France.

== See also ==
- Communes of the Vendée department
