= Chavagnes-les-Redoux =

- Commune
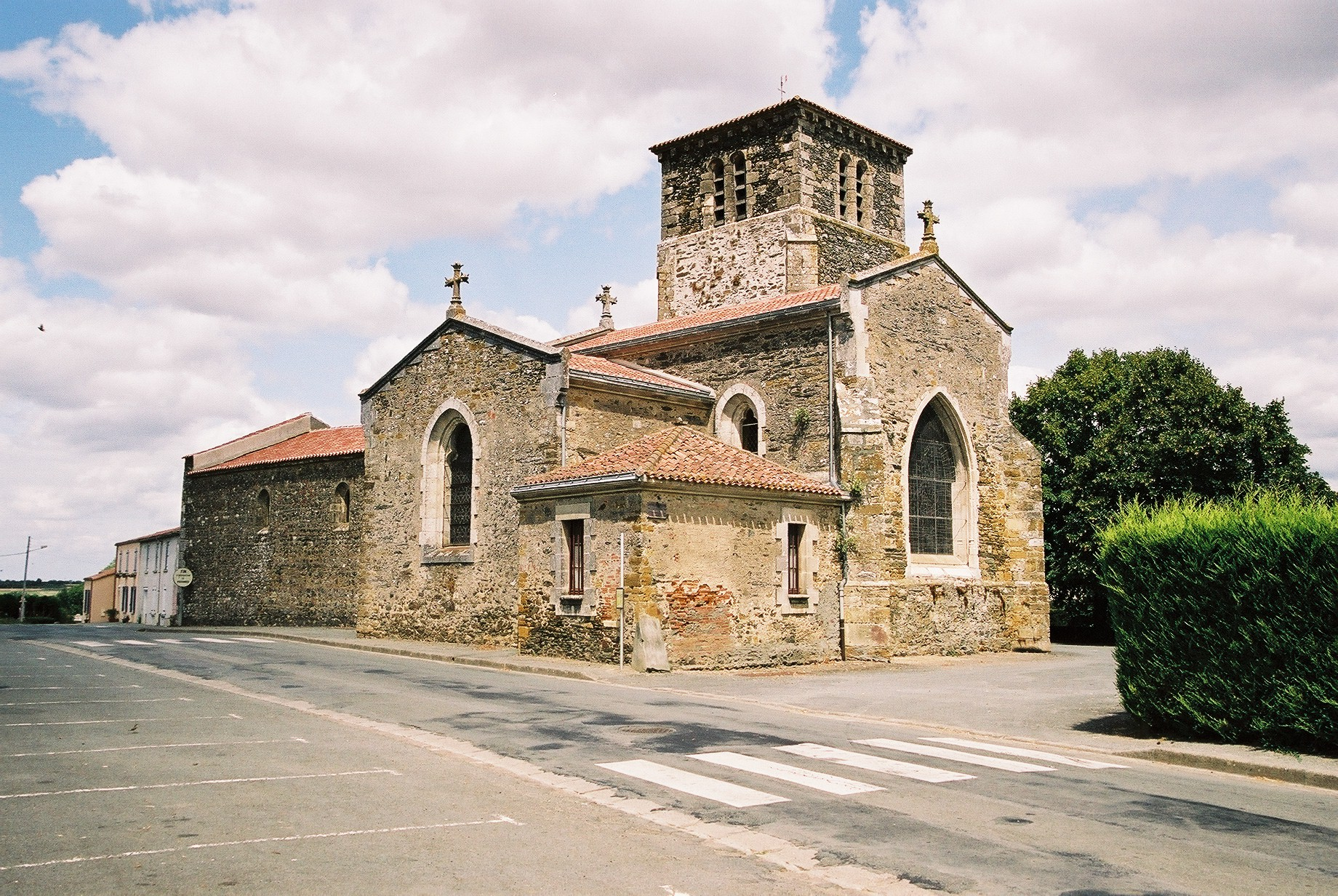
- The church of Our Lady of the Assumption, in Chavagnes-les-Redoux
- Location of Chavagnes-les-Redoux
- Location within France Location within Pays de la Loire
- Coordinates: 46°43′03″N 0°55′03″W
- Country: France
- Region: Pays de la Loire
- Department: Vendée
- Arrondissement: Fontenay-le-Comte
- Canton: Les Herbiers
- Intercommunality: Pays de Pouzauges

Government
  - Mayor (2020–2026): Frédéric Portrait
- Area^{1}: 13.34 km^{2} (5.15 sq mi)
- Highest elevation: 114 m (374 ft)
- Lowest elevation: 45 m (148 ft)
- Population (2023): 857
  - Density: 64.2/km^{2} (166/sq mi)
- Time zone: UTC+01:00 (CET)
  - Summer (DST): UTC+02:00 (CEST)
- INSEE/Postal code: 85066 /85390
- ^{1} French Land Register data, which excludes lakes, ponds, glaciers > 1 km^{2} (0.386 sq mi or 247 acres) and river estuaries.

Chavagnes-les-Redoux (French pronunciation: [ʃavaɲ le ʁədu]) is a commune of the Vendée department in the Pays de la Loire region in western France.

== See also ==
- Communes of the Vendée department
