= Pissotte =

- Commune
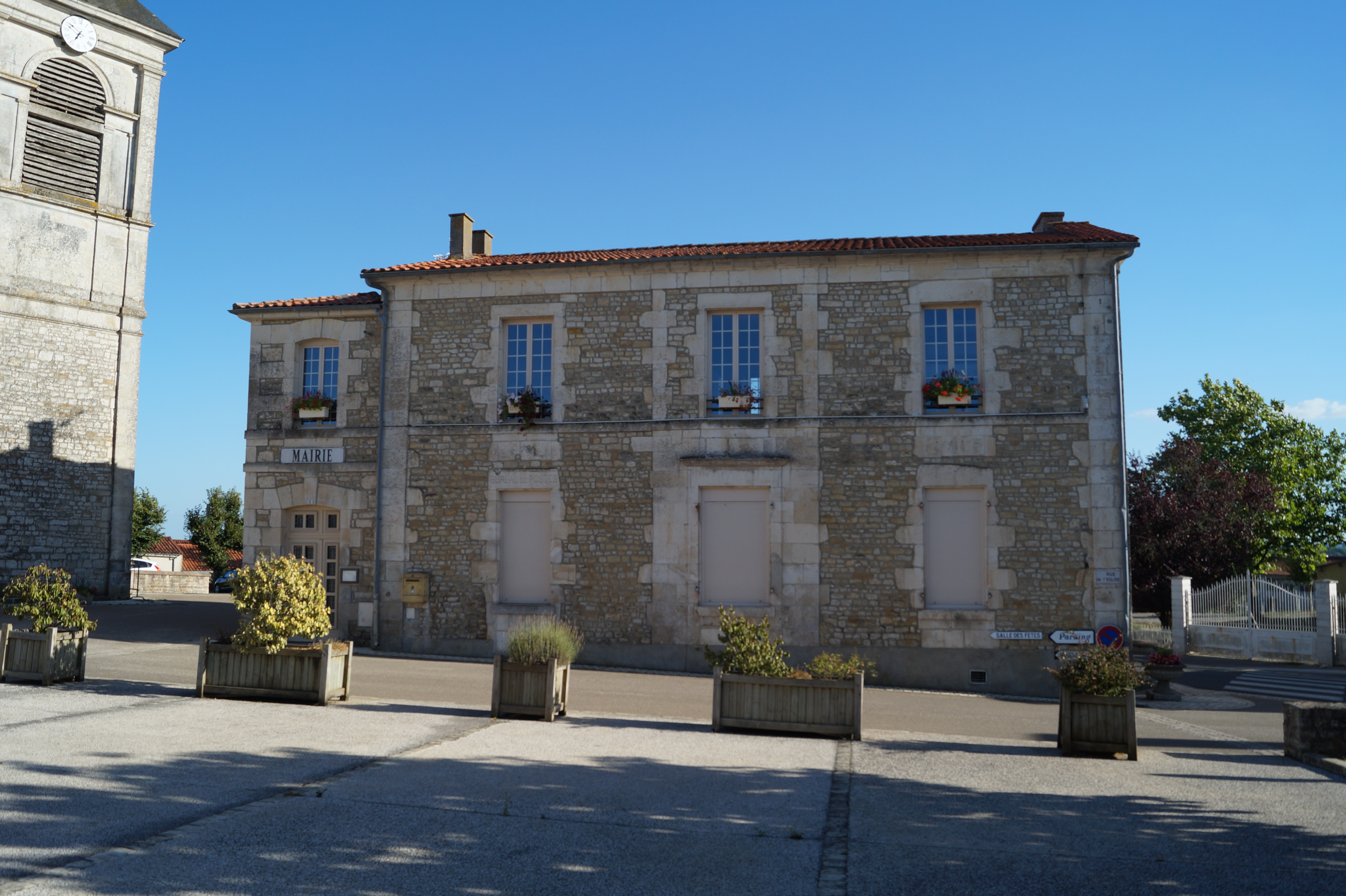
- Town hall of Pissotte
- Location of Pissotte
- Location within France Location within Pays de la Loire
- Coordinates: 46°29′48″N 0°48′23″W
- Country: France
- Region: Pays de la Loire
- Department: Vendée
- Arrondissement: Fontenay-le-Comte
- Canton: Fontenay-le-Comte

Government
  - Mayor (2020–2026): Michel Savineau
- Area^{1}: 11.96 km^{2} (4.62 sq mi)
- Highest elevation: 107 m (351 ft)
- Lowest elevation: 8 m (26 ft)
- Population (2023): 1,132
  - Density: 94.65/km^{2} (245.1/sq mi)
- Time zone: UTC+01:00 (CET)
  - Summer (DST): UTC+02:00 (CEST)
- INSEE/Postal code: 85176 /85200
- ^{1} French Land Register data, which excludes lakes, ponds, glaciers > 1 km^{2} (0.386 sq mi or 247 acres) and river estuaries.

Pissotte (French pronunciation: [pisɔt]) is a commune in the Vendée department in the Pays de la Loire region in western France.

== See also ==
- Communes of the Vendée department
