= Les Pineaux =

- Commune
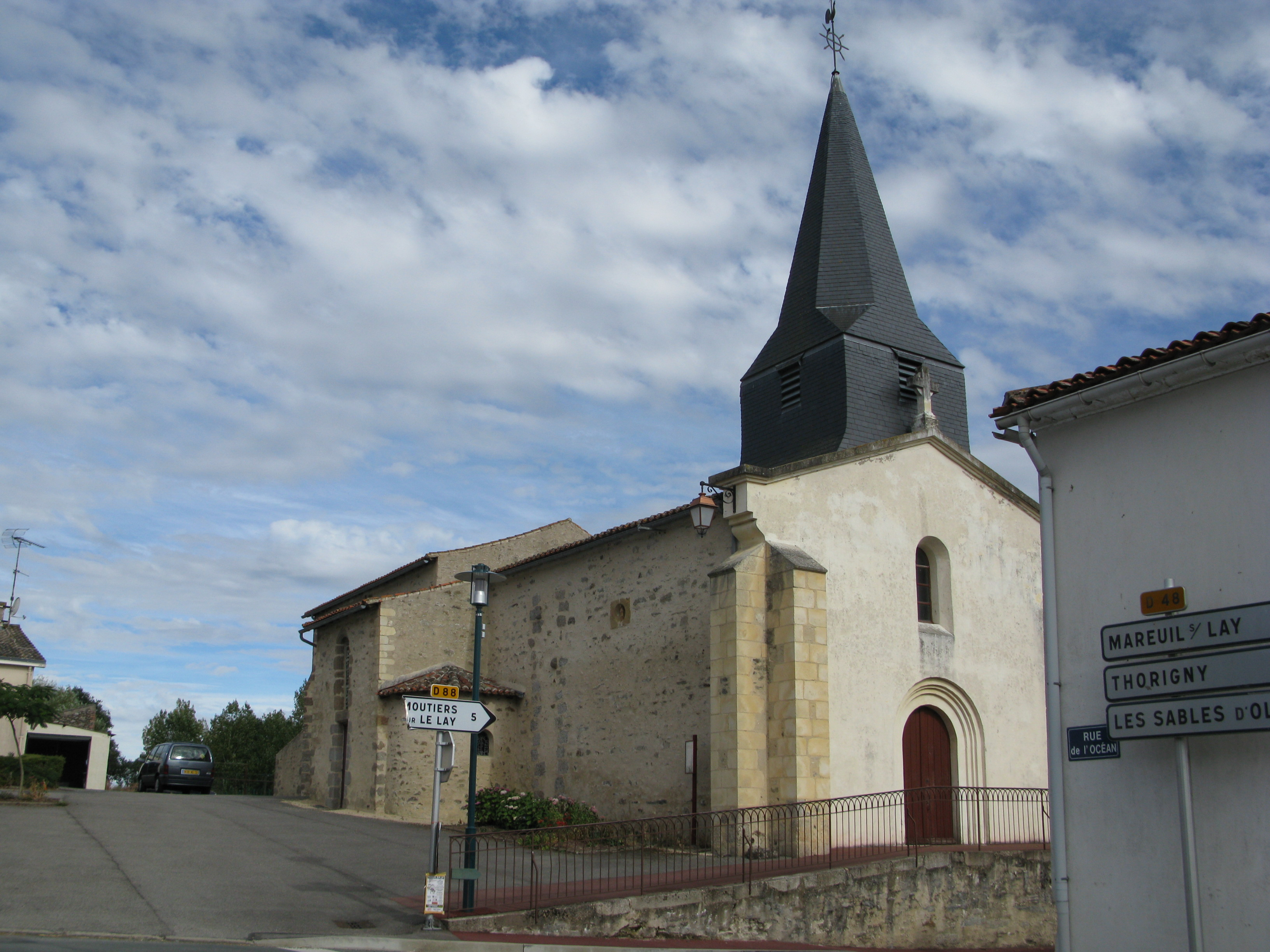
- The church in Les Pineaux
- Location of Les Pineaux
- Location within France Location within Pays de la Loire
- Coordinates: 46°35′46″N 1°10′48″W
- Country: France
- Region: Pays de la Loire
- Department: Vendée
- Arrondissement: Fontenay-le-Comte
- Canton: Mareuil-sur-Lay-Dissais
- Intercommunality: Sud Vendée Littoral

Government
  - Mayor (2020–2026): Pascal Paquereau
- Area^{1}: 17.44 km^{2} (6.73 sq mi)
- Highest elevation: 84 m (276 ft)
- Lowest elevation: 18 m (59 ft)
- Population (2023): 688
  - Density: 39.4/km^{2} (102/sq mi)
- Time zone: UTC+01:00 (CET)
  - Summer (DST): UTC+02:00 (CEST)
- INSEE/Postal code: 85175 /85320
- ^{1} French Land Register data, which excludes lakes, ponds, glaciers > 1 km^{2} (0.386 sq mi or 247 acres) and river estuaries.

Les Pineaux (French pronunciation: [le pino]) is a commune in the Vendée department in the Pays de la Loire region in western France.

== See also ==
- Communes of the Vendée department
