= Le Mazeau =

- Commune
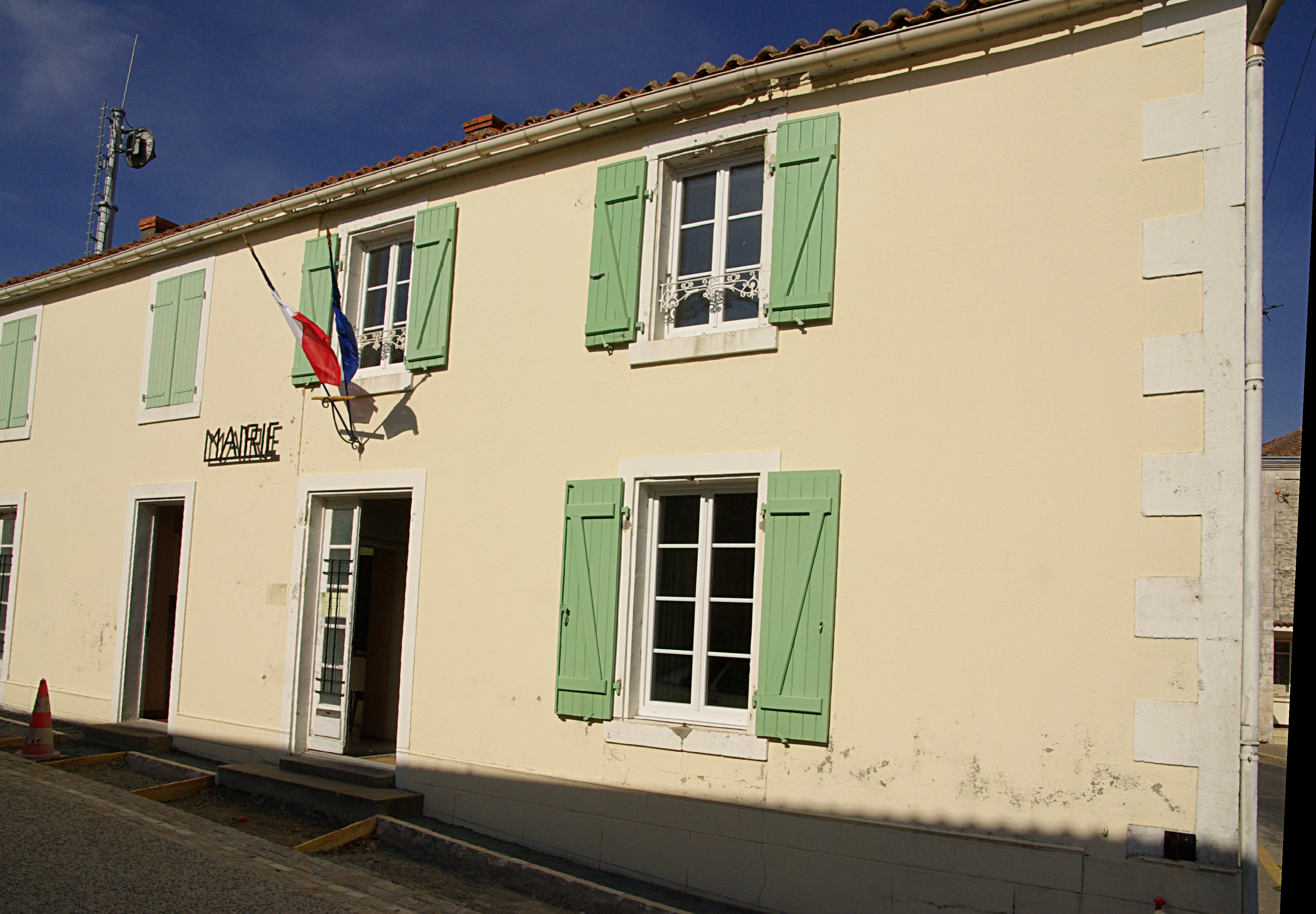
- Town hall
- Location of Le Mazeau
- Location within France Location within Pays de la Loire
- Coordinates: 46°20′09″N 0°40′24″W
- Country: France
- Region: Pays de la Loire
- Department: Vendée
- Arrondissement: Fontenay-le-Comte
- Canton: Fontenay-le-Comte
- Intercommunality: Vendée Sèvre Autise

Government
  - Mayor (2020–2026): Bernard Bordet
- Area^{1}: 8.23 km^{2} (3.18 sq mi)
- Highest elevation: 12 m (39 ft)
- Lowest elevation: 1 m (3.3 ft)
- Population (2023): 464
  - Density: 56.4/km^{2} (146/sq mi)
- Time zone: UTC+01:00 (CET)
  - Summer (DST): UTC+02:00 (CEST)
- INSEE/Postal code: 85139 /85420
- ^{1} French Land Register data, which excludes lakes, ponds, glaciers > 1 km^{2} (0.386 sq mi or 247 acres) and river estuaries.

Le Mazeau (French pronunciation: [lə mazo]) is a commune in the Vendée department in the Pays de la Loire region in western France.

== See also ==
- Communes of the Vendée department
