= Cheffois =

- Commune
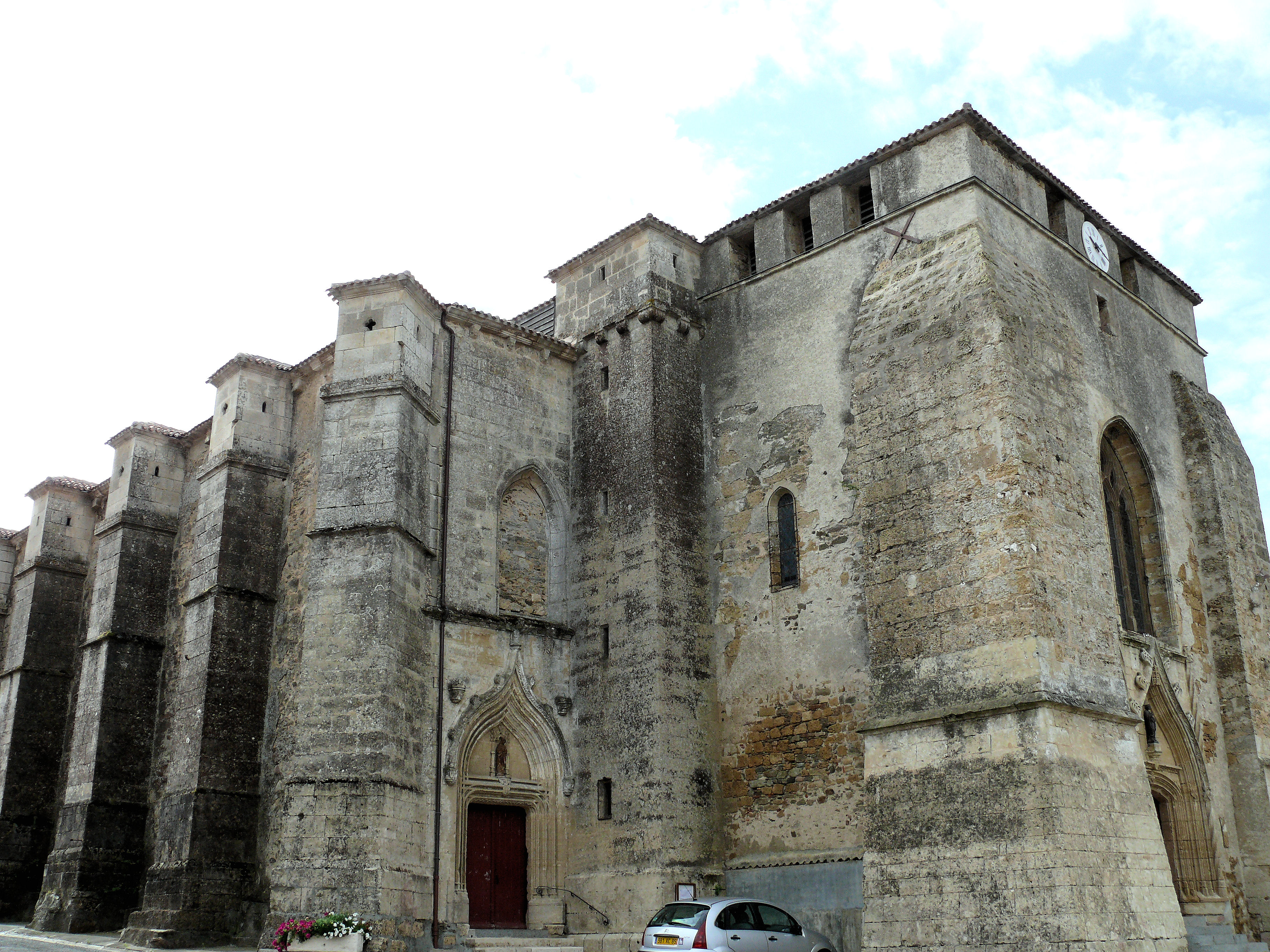
- The church of Saint-Pierre, in Cheffois
- Location of Cheffois
- Location within France Location within Pays de la Loire
- Coordinates: 46°40′10″N 0°47′24″W
- Country: France
- Region: Pays de la Loire
- Department: Vendée
- Arrondissement: Fontenay-le-Comte
- Canton: La Châtaigneraie
- Intercommunality: Pays de la Châtaigneraie

Government
  - Mayor (2020–2026): Jean-Marie Giraud
- Area^{1}: 18.63 km^{2} (7.19 sq mi)
- Highest elevation: 199 m (653 ft)
- Lowest elevation: 75 m (246 ft)
- Population (2023): 1,009
  - Density: 54.16/km^{2} (140.3/sq mi)
- Time zone: UTC+01:00 (CET)
  - Summer (DST): UTC+02:00 (CEST)
- INSEE/Postal code: 85067 /85390
- ^{1} French Land Register data, which excludes lakes, ponds, glaciers > 1 km^{2} (0.386 sq mi or 247 acres) and river estuaries.

Cheffois (French pronunciation: [ʃɛfwa]) is a commune of the Vendée department in the Pays de la Loire region in western France.

== See also ==
- Communes of the Vendée department
