= Xanton-Chassenon =

- Commune
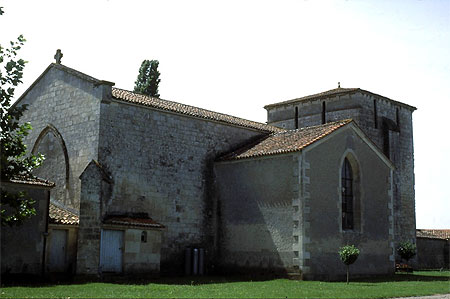
- The church in Xanton-Chassenon
- Location of Xanton-Chassenon
- Location within France Location within Pays de la Loire
- Coordinates: 46°27′12″N 0°41′42″W
- Country: France
- Region: Pays de la Loire
- Department: Vendée
- Arrondissement: Fontenay-le-Comte
- Canton: Fontenay-le-Comte
- Intercommunality: Vendée-Sèvre-Autise

Government
  - Mayor (2020–2026): Claudy Renault
- Area^{1}: 19.24 km^{2} (7.43 sq mi)
- Highest elevation: 81 m (266 ft)
- Lowest elevation: 7 m (23 ft)
- Population (2023): 743
  - Density: 38.6/km^{2} (100/sq mi)
- Time zone: UTC+01:00 (CET)
  - Summer (DST): UTC+02:00 (CEST)
- INSEE/Postal code: 85306 /85240
- ^{1} French Land Register data, which excludes lakes, ponds, glaciers > 1 km^{2} (0.386 sq mi or 247 acres) and river estuaries.

Xanton-Chassenon (French pronunciation: [ɡzɑ̃tɔ̃ ʃasnɔ̃]) is a commune in the Vendée department in the Pays de la Loire region in western France.

== Population ==
Historical population
Year	Pop.	±% p.a.
1968	561	—
1975	540	−0.54%
1982	646	+2.59%
1990	691	+0.85%
1999	651	−0.66%
2007	690	+0.73%
2012	727	+1.05%
2017	729	+0.05%
2023	743	+0.32%
Source: INSEE

== See also ==
- Communes of the Vendée department
