= Loge-Fougereuse =

- Commune
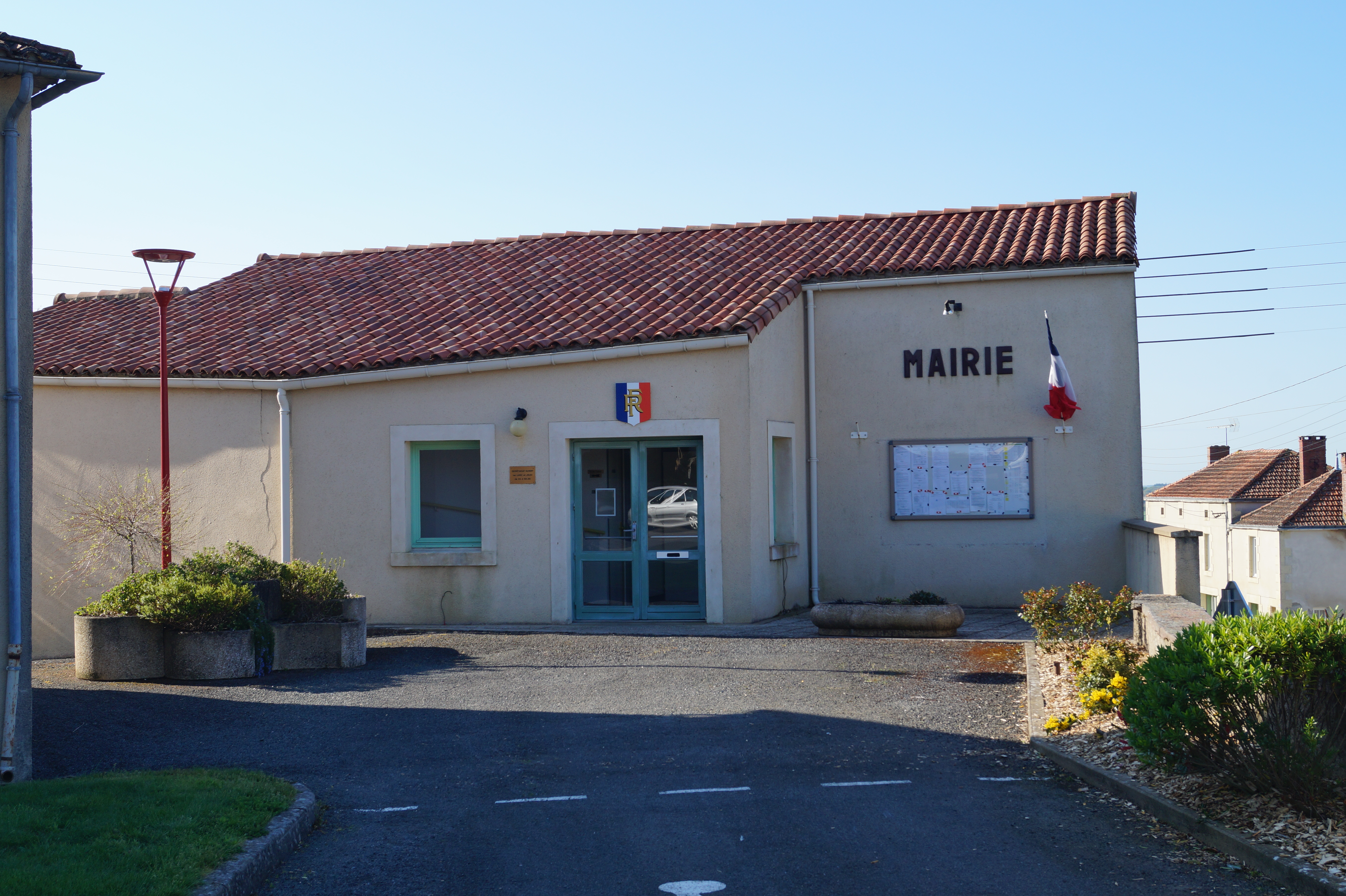
- Town hall

- Coat of arms
- Location of Loge-Fougereuse
- Location within France Location within Pays de la Loire
- Coordinates: 46°36′50″N 0°41′24″W
- Country: France
- Region: Pays de la Loire
- Department: Vendée
- Arrondissement: Fontenay-le-Comte
- Canton: La Châtaigneraie
- Intercommunality: Pays de la Châtaigneraie

Government
  - Mayor (2020–2026): Alain Careil
- Area^{1}: 10.37 km^{2} (4.00 sq mi)
- Highest elevation: 166 m (545 ft)
- Lowest elevation: 90 m (300 ft)
- Population (2023): 373
  - Density: 36.0/km^{2} (93.2/sq mi)
- Time zone: UTC+01:00 (CET)
  - Summer (DST): UTC+02:00 (CEST)
- INSEE/Postal code: 85125 /85120
- ^{1} French Land Register data, which excludes lakes, ponds, glaciers > 1 km^{2} (0.386 sq mi or 247 acres) and river estuaries.

Loge-Fougereuse (French pronunciation: [lɔʒ fuʒʁøz]) is a commune in the Vendée department in the Pays de la Loire region in western France.

== See also ==
- Communes of the Vendée department
