= Saint-Sigismond, Vendée =

Saint-Sigismond
- Commune
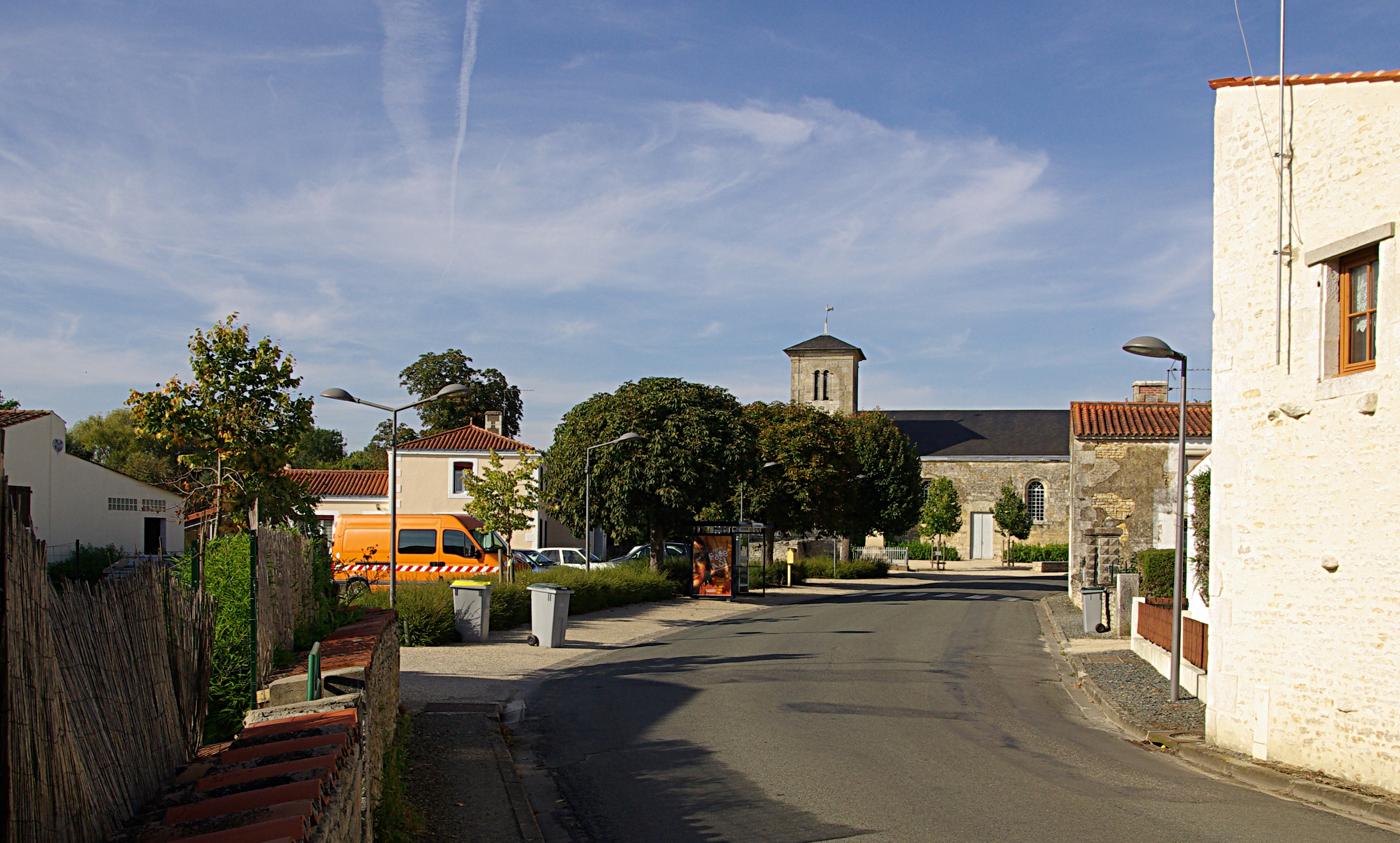
- A view towards the church
- Location of Saint-Sigismond
- Location within France Location within Pays de la Loire
- Coordinates: 46°21′04″N 0°41′20″W
- Country: France
- Region: Pays de la Loire
- Department: Vendée
- Arrondissement: Fontenay-le-Comte
- Canton: Fontenay-le-Comte
- Intercommunality: Vendée Sèvre Autise

Government
  - Mayor (2020–2026): Denis La Mache
- Area^{1}: 10.46 km^{2} (4.04 sq mi)
- Highest elevation: 18 m (59 ft)
- Lowest elevation: 1 m (3.3 ft)
- Population (2023): 428
  - Density: 40.9/km^{2} (106/sq mi)
- Time zone: UTC+01:00 (CET)
  - Summer (DST): UTC+02:00 (CEST)
- INSEE/Postal code: 85269 /85420
- ^{1} French Land Register data, which excludes lakes, ponds, glaciers > 1 km^{2} (0.386 sq mi or 247 acres) and river estuaries.

Saint-Sigismond (French pronunciation: [sɛ̃ siʒismɔ̃]) is a commune in the Vendée department in the Pays de la Loire region in western France.

== See also ==
- Communes of the Vendée department
