= Communes of the Vendée department =

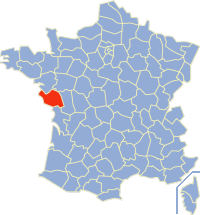

The following is a list of the 253 communes of the Vendée department of France.

The communes cooperate in the following intercommunalities (as of 2025):

- Communauté d'agglomération Terres de Montaigu
- Communauté d'agglomération La Roche-sur-Yon Agglomération
- Communauté d'agglomération Les Sables d'Olonne Agglomération
- Communauté d'agglomération du Pays de Saint-Gilles-Croix-de-Vie
- Communauté de communes Challans-Gois Communauté
- Communauté de communes de l'Île de Noirmoutier
- Communauté de communes Océan Marais de Monts
- Communauté de communes du Pays des Achards
- Communauté de communes Pays de Chantonnay
- Communauté de communes du Pays de la Châtaigneraie
- Communauté de communes Pays de Fontenay-Vendée
- Communauté de communes du Pays des Herbiers
- Communauté de communes du Pays de Mortagne
- Communauté de communes du Pays de Pouzauges
- Communauté de communes du Pays de Saint-Fulgent Les Essarts
- Communauté de communes Sud Vendée Littoral
- Communauté de communes Vendée Grand Littoral
- Communauté de communes Vendée, Sèvre, Autise
- Communauté de communes de Vie et Boulogne

| INSEE code | Postal code | Commune |
|---|---|---|
| 85152 | 85150 | Les Achards |
| 85001 | 85460 | L'Aiguillon-la-Presqu'île |
| 85002 | 85220 | L'Aiguillon-sur-Vie |
| 85003 | 85190 | Aizenay |
| 85004 | 85750 | Angles |
| 85005 | 85120 | Antigny |
| 85006 | 85220 | Apremont |
| 85008 | 85430 | Aubigny-Les Clouzeaux |
| 85009 | 85200 | Auchay-sur-Vendée |
| 85010 | 85440 | Avrillé |
| 85011 | 85630 | Barbâtre |
| 85012 | 85550 | La Barre-de-Monts |
| 85013 | 85130 | Bazoges-en-Paillers |
| 85014 | 85390 | Bazoges-en-Pareds |
| 85015 | 85170 | Beaufou |
| 85016 | 85190 | Beaulieu-sous-la-Roche |
| 85017 | 85500 | Beaurepaire |
| 85018 | 85230 | Beauvoir-sur-Mer |
| 85019 | 85170 | Bellevigny |
| 85020 | 85490 | Benet |
| 85022 | 85560 | Le Bernard |
| 85023 | 85320 | Bessay |
| 85024 | 85710 | Bois-de-Céné |
| 85025 | 85600 | La Boissière-de-Montaigu |
| 85026 | 85430 | La Boissière-des-Landes |
| 85028 | 85420 | Bouillé-Courdault |
| 85029 | 85230 | Bouin |
| 85031 | 85510 | Le Boupère |
| 85033 | 85200 | Bourneau |
| 85034 | 85480 | Bournezeau |
| 85243 | 85470 | Brem-sur-Mer |
| 85035 | 85470 | Bretignolles-sur-Mer |
| 85036 | 85320 | La Bretonnière-la-Claye |
| 85038 | 85260 | Les Brouzils |
| 85039 | 85530 | La Bruffière |
| 85040 | 85410 | La Caillère-Saint-Hilaire |
| 85042 | 85450 | Chaillé-les-Marais |
| 85045 | 85220 | La Chaize-Giraud |
| 85046 | 85310 | La Chaize-le-Vicomte |
| 85047 | 85300 | Challans |
| 85049 | 85450 | Champagné-les-Marais |
| 85050 | 85540 | Le Champ-Saint-Père |
| 85051 | 85110 | Chantonnay |
| 85302 | 85130 | Chanverrie |
| 85054 | 85220 | La Chapelle-Hermier |
| 85055 | 85670 | La Chapelle-Palluau |
| 85056 | 85210 | La Chapelle-Thémer |
| 85058 | 85400 | Chasnais |
| 85059 | 85120 | La Châtaigneraie |
| 85061 | 85320 | Château-Guibert |
| 85062 | 85710 | Châteauneuf |
| 85064 | 85140 | Chauché |
| 85065 | 85250 | Chavagnes-en-Paillers |
| 85066 | 85390 | Chavagnes-les-Redoux |
| 85067 | 85390 | Cheffois |
| 85070 | 85220 | Coëx |
| 85071 | 85220 | Commequiers |
| 85072 | 85260 | La Copechagnière |
| 85073 | 85320 | Corpe |
| 85074 | 85320 | La Couture |
| 85076 | 85610 | Cugand-la-Bernardière |
| 85077 | 85540 | Curzon |
| 85078 | 85420 | Damvix |
| 85080 | 85200 | Doix-lès-Fontaines |
| 85081 | 85170 | Dompierre-sur-Yon |
| 85082 | 85590 | Les Epesses |
| 85083 | 85740 | L'Épine |
| 85084 | 85140 | Essarts-en-Bocage |
| 85086 | 85670 | Falleron |
| 85087 | 85240 | Faymoreau |
| 85088 | 85800 | Le Fenouiller |
| 85089 | 85280 | La Ferrière |
| 85092 | 85200 | Fontenay-le-Comte |
| 85093 | 85480 | Fougeré |
| 85094 | 85240 | Foussais-Payré |
| 85095 | 85300 | Froidfond |
| 85096 | 85710 | La Garnache |
| 85097 | 85130 | La Gaubretière |
| 85098 | 85190 | La Genétouze |
| 85099 | 85150 | Le Girouard |
| 85100 | 85800 | Givrand |
| 85101 | 85540 | Le Givre |
| 85102 | 85670 | Grand'Landes |
| 85103 | 85440 | Grosbreuil |
| 85104 | 85580 | Grues |
| 85105 | 85770 | Le Gué-de-Velluire |
| 85106 | 85680 | La Guérinière |
| 85108 | 85260 | L'Herbergement |
| 85109 | 85500 | Les Herbiers |
| 85110 | 85570 | L'Hermenault |
| 85111 | 85770 | L'Île-d'Elle |
| 85112 | 85340 | L'Île-d'Olonne |
| 85113 | 85350 | L'Île-d'Yeu |
| 85114 | 85520 | Jard-sur-Mer |
| 85115 | 85110 | La Jaudonnière |
| 85116 | 85540 | La Jonchère |
| 85117 | 85400 | Lairoux |
| 85118 | 85150 | Landeronde |
| 85119 | 85130 | Les Landes-Genusson |
| 85120 | 85220 | Landevieille |
| 85121 | 85370 | Le Langon |
| 85123 | 85420 | Liez |
| 85125 | 85120 | Loge-Fougereuse |
| 85126 | 85200 | Longèves |
| 85127 | 85560 | Longeville-sur-Mer |
| 85128 | 85400 | Luçon |
| 85129 | 85170 | Les Lucs-sur-Boulogne |
| 85130 | 85190 | Maché |
| 85131 | 85400 | Les Magnils-Reigniers |
| 85132 | 85420 | Maillé |
| 85133 | 85420 | Maillezais |
| 85134 | 85590 | Mallièvre |
| 85135 | 85320 | Mareuil-sur-Lay-Dissais |
| 85136 | 85240 | Marillet |
| 85137 | 85570 | Marsais-Sainte-Radégonde |
| 85138 | 85150 | Martinet |
| 85139 | 85420 | Le Mazeau |
| 85140 | 85700 | La Meilleraie-Tillay |
| 85141 | 85700 | Menomblet |
| 85142 | 85140 | La Merlatière |
| 85143 | 85200 | Mervent |
| 85144 | 85500 | Mesnard-la-Barotière |
| 85145 | 85110 | Monsireigne |
| 85146 | 85600 | Montaigu-Vendée |
| 85147 | 85700 | Montournais |
| 85148 | 85200 | Montreuil |

| INSEE code | Postal code | Commune |
|---|---|---|
| 85197 | 85260 | Montréverd |
| 85149 | 85450 | Moreilles |
| 85151 | 85290 | Mortagne-sur-Sèvre |
| 85153 | 85640 | Mouchamps |
| 85155 | 85000 | Mouilleron-le-Captif |
| 85154 | 85390 | Mouilleron-Saint-Germain |
| 85156 | 85540 | Moutiers-les-Mauxfaits |
| 85157 | 85320 | Moutiers-sur-le-Lay |
| 85158 | 85370 | Mouzeuil-Saint-Martin |
| 85159 | 85370 | Nalliers |
| 85160 | 85310 | Nesmy |
| 85161 | 85430 | Nieul-le-Dolent |
| 85163 | 85330 | Noirmoutier-en-l'Île |
| 85164 | 85690 | Notre-Dame-de-Monts |
| 85189 | 85270 | Notre-Dame-de-Riez |
| 85165 | 85200 | L'Orbrie |
| 85167 | | L'Oie |
| 85169 | 85670 | Palluau |
| 85171 | 85320 | Péault |
| 85172 | 85300 | Le Perrier |
| 85174 | 85570 | Petosse |
| 85175 | 85320 | Les Pineaux |
| 85176 | 85200 | Pissotte |
| 85178 | 85170 | Le Poiré-sur-Vie |
| 85179 | 85440 | Poiroux |
| 85181 | 85570 | Pouillé |
| 85182 | 85700 | Pouzauges |
| 85184 | 85240 | Puy-de-Serre |
| 85185 | 85450 | Puyravault |
| 85186 | 85250 | La Rabatelière |
| 85187 | 85700 | Réaumur |
| 85188 | 85210 | La Réorthe |
| 85162 | 85240 | Rives-d'Autise |
| 85213 | 85310 | Rives-de-l'Yon |
| 85292 | 85410 | Rives-du-Fougerais |
| 85190 | 85620 | Rocheservière |
| 85191 | 85000 | La Roche-sur-Yon |
| 85192 | 85510 | Rochetrejoux |
| 85193 | 85320 | Rosnay |
| 85194 | 85100 | Les Sables-d'Olonne |
| 85196 | 85250 | Saint-André-Goule-d'Oie |
| 85198 | 85130 | Saint-Aubin-des-Ormeaux |
| 85199 | 85210 | Saint-Aubin-la-Plaine |
| 85200 | 85540 | Saint-Avaugourd-des-Landes |
| 85201 | 85540 | Saint-Benoist-sur-Mer |
| 85204 | 85670 | Saint-Christophe-du-Ligneron |
| 85205 | 85410 | Saint-Cyr-des-Gâts |
| 85206 | 85540 | Saint-Cyr-en-Talmondais |
| 85207 | 85580 | Saint-Denis-du-Payré |
| 85208 | 85170 | Saint-Denis-la-Chevasse |
| 85202 | 85110 | Sainte-Cécile |
| 85211 | 85150 | Sainte-Flaive-des-Loups |
| 85212 | | Sainte-Florence |
| 85214 | 85150 | Sainte-Foy |
| 85216 | 85400 | Sainte-Gemme-la-Plaine |
| 85261 | 85320 | Sainte-Pexine |
| 85267 | 85450 | Sainte-Radégonde-des-Noyers |
| 85209 | 85210 | Saint-Étienne-de-Brillouet |
| 85210 | 85670 | Saint-Étienne-du-Bois |
| 85215 | 85250 | Saint-Fulgent |
| 85218 | 85150 | Saint-Georges-de-Pointindoux |
| 85220 | 85110 | Saint-Germain-de-Prinçay |
| 85221 | 85230 | Saint-Gervais |
| 85222 | 85800 | Saint-Gilles-Croix-de-Vie |
| 85226 | 85270 | Saint-Hilaire-de-Riez |
| 85227 | 85240 | Saint-Hilaire-des-Loges |
| 85229 | 85120 | Saint-Hilaire-de-Voust |
| 85231 | 85440 | Saint-Hilaire-la-Forêt |
| 85232 | 85480 | Saint-Hilaire-le-Vouhis |
| 85234 | 85160 | Saint-Jean-de-Monts |
| 85223 | 85210 | Saint-Jean-d'Hermine |
| 85235 | 85210 | Saint-Juire-Champgillon |
| 85236 | 85150 | Saint-Julien-des-Landes |
| 85237 | 85410 | Saint-Laurent-de-la-Salle |
| 85238 | 85290 | Saint-Laurent-sur-Sèvre |
| 85239 | 85220 | Saint-Maixent-sur-Vie |
| 85240 | 85590 | Saint-Malô-du-Bois |
| 85242 | 85590 | Saint-Mars-la-Réorthe |
| 85244 | 85200 | Saint-Martin-de-Fraigneau |
| 85245 | 85570 | Saint-Martin-des-Fontaines |
| 85246 | 85140 | Saint-Martin-des-Noyers |
| 85247 | 85130 | Saint-Martin-des-Tilleuls |
| 85248 | 85210 | Saint-Martin-Lars-en-Sainte-Hermine |
| 85250 | 85150 | Saint-Mathurin |
| 85251 | 85120 | Saint-Maurice-des-Noues |
| 85252 | 85390 | Saint-Maurice-le-Girard |
| 85254 | 85700 | Saint-Mesmin |
| 85255 | 85580 | Saint-Michel-en-l'Herm |
| 85256 | 85200 | Saint-Michel-le-Cloucq |
| 85259 | 85500 | Saint-Paul-en-Pareds |
| 85260 | 85670 | Saint-Paul-Mont-Penit |
| 85262 | 85660 | Saint-Philbert-de-Bouaine |
| 85264 | 85120 | Saint-Pierre-du-Chemin |
| 85265 | 85420 | Saint-Pierre-le-Vieux |
| 85266 | 85110 | Saint-Prouant |
| 85268 | 85220 | Saint-Révérend |
| 85269 | 85420 | Saint-Sigismond |
| 85273 | 85230 | Saint-Urbain |
| 85274 | 85570 | Saint-Valérien |
| 85276 | 85110 | Saint-Vincent-Sterlanges |
| 85277 | 85540 | Saint-Vincent-sur-Graon |
| 85278 | 85520 | Saint-Vincent-sur-Jard |
| 85280 | 85300 | Sallertaine |
| 85281 | 85200 | Sérigné |
| 85090 | 85700 | Sèvremont |
| 85282 | 85110 | Sigournais |
| 85284 | 85300 | Soullans |
| 85285 | 85310 | Le Tablier |
| 85286 | 85450 | La Taillée |
| 85287 | 85390 | Tallud-Sainte-Gemme |
| 85288 | 85440 | Talmont-Saint-Hilaire |
| 85289 | 85120 | Terval |
| 85290 | 85210 | Thiré |
| 85291 | 85480 | Thorigny |
| 85293 | 85130 | Tiffauges |
| 85294 | 85360 | La Tranche-sur-Mer |
| 85295 | 85600 | Treize-Septiers |
| 85296 | 85590 | Treize-Vents |
| 85297 | 85580 | Triaize |
| 85298 | 85150 | Vairé |
| 85177 | 85770 | Les Velluire-sur-Vendée |
| 85300 | 85190 | Venansault |
| 85301 | 85250 | Vendrennes |
| 85303 | 85770 | Vix |
| 85304 | 85450 | Vouillé-les-Marais |
| 85305 | 85120 | Vouvant |
| 85306 | 85240 | Xanton-Chassenon |
