= Triaize =

- Commune
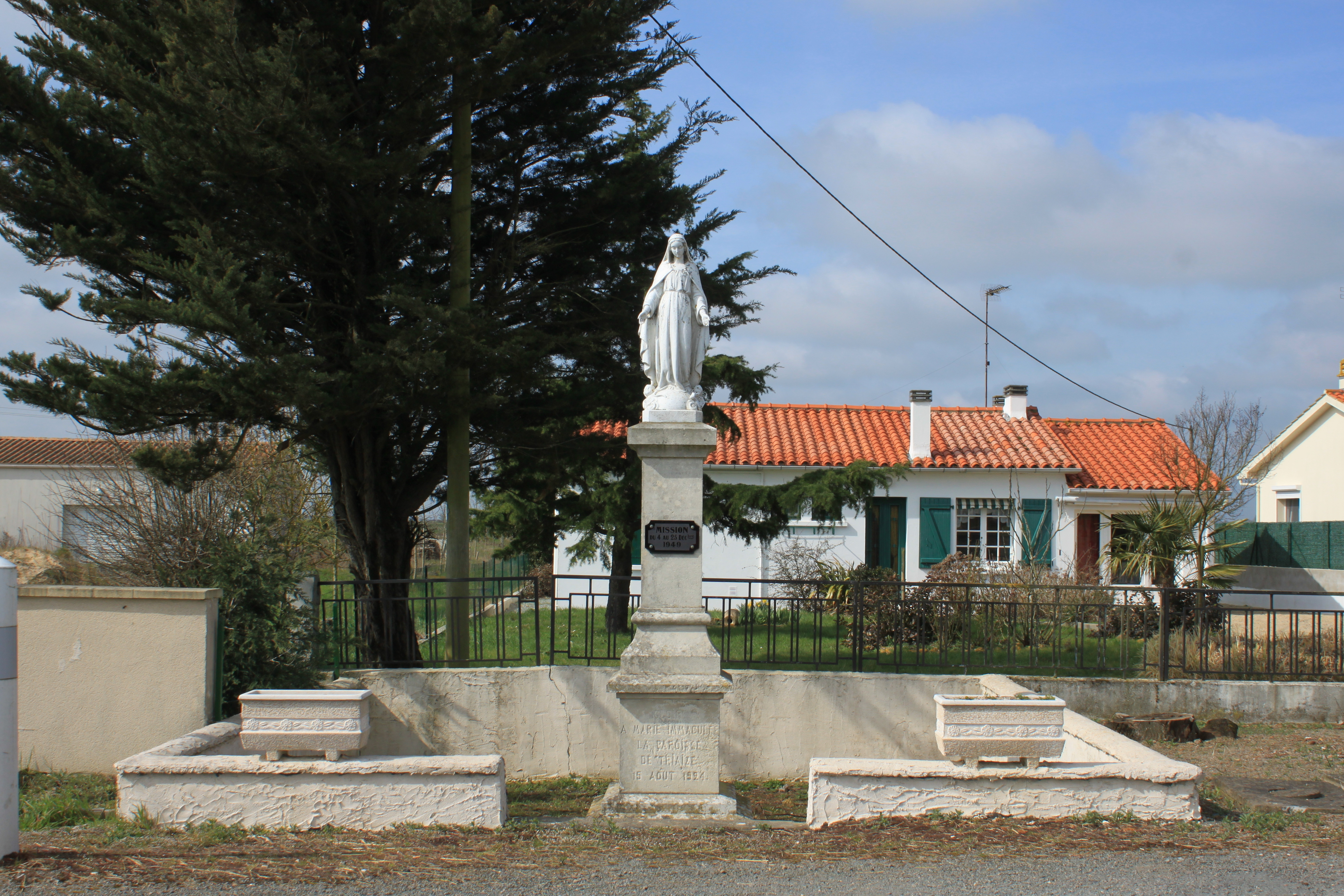
- The statue of the Virgin, in Triaize
- Location of Triaize
- Location within France Location within Pays de la Loire
- Coordinates: 46°23′40″N 1°11′47″W
- Country: France
- Region: Pays de la Loire
- Department: Vendée
- Arrondissement: Fontenay-le-Comte
- Canton: Luçon

Government
  - Mayor (2020–2026): Guy Barbot
- Area^{1}: 58.80 km^{2} (22.70 sq mi)
- Highest elevation: 17 m (56 ft)
- Lowest elevation: 0 m (0 ft)
- Population (2023): 1,071
  - Density: 18.21/km^{2} (47.17/sq mi)
- Time zone: UTC+01:00 (CET)
  - Summer (DST): UTC+02:00 (CEST)
- INSEE/Postal code: 85297 /85580
- ^{1} French Land Register data, which excludes lakes, ponds, glaciers > 1 km^{2} (0.386 sq mi or 247 acres) and river estuaries.

Triaize (French pronunciation: [tʁijɛz]) is a commune in the Vendée department in the Pays de la Loire region in western France.

== See also ==
- Communes of the Vendée department
