= Longèves, Vendée =

Longèves
- Commune
- Coat of arms
- Location of Longèves
- Location within France Location within Pays de la Loire
- Coordinates: 46°28′52″N 0°51′11″W
- Country: France
- Region: Pays de la Loire
- Department: Vendée
- Arrondissement: Fontenay-le-Comte
- Canton: Fontenay-le-Comte
- Intercommunality: Pays de Fontenay-Vendée

Government
  - Mayor (2020–2026): Roger Marot
- Area^{1}: 11.72 km^{2} (4.53 sq mi)
- Highest elevation: 52 m (171 ft)
- Lowest elevation: 2 m (6.6 ft)
- Population (2023): 1,369
  - Density: 116.8/km^{2} (302.5/sq mi)
- Time zone: UTC+01:00 (CET)
  - Summer (DST): UTC+02:00 (CEST)
- INSEE/Postal code: 85126 /85200
- ^{1} French Land Register data, which excludes lakes, ponds, glaciers > 1 km^{2} (0.386 sq mi or 247 acres) and river estuaries.

Longèves (French pronunciation: [lɔ̃ʒɛv]) is a commune in the Vendée department in the Pays de la Loire region in western France.

== See also ==
- Communes of the Vendée department
