= La Meilleraie-Tillay =

- Commune
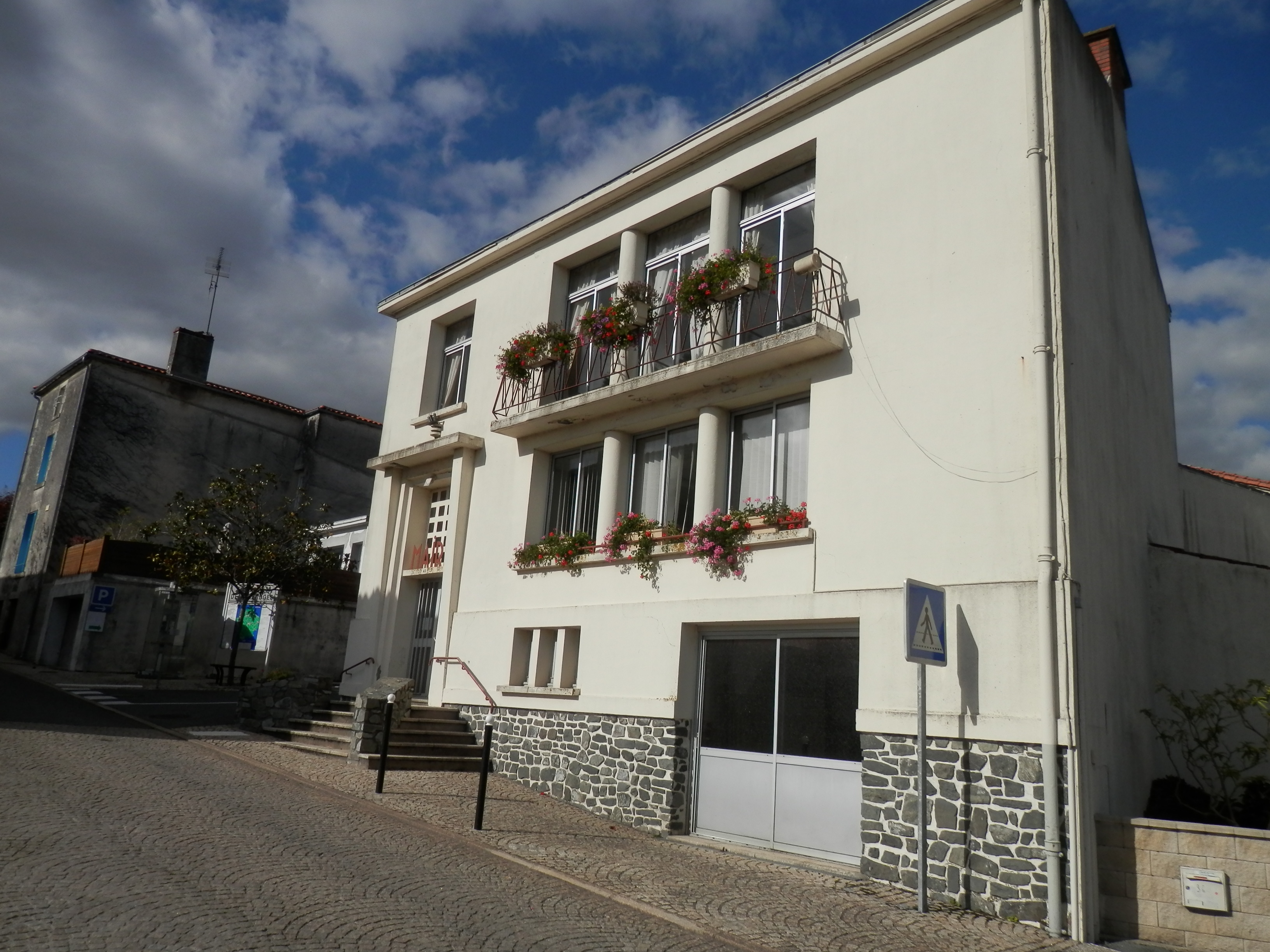
- Town hall of La Meilleraie-Tillay

- Coat of arms
- Location of La Meilleraie-Tillay
- Location within France Location within Pays de la Loire
- Coordinates: 46°44′32″N 0°50′43″W
- Country: France
- Region: Pays de la Loire
- Department: Vendée
- Arrondissement: Fontenay-le-Comte
- Canton: Les Herbiers
- Intercommunality: Pays de Pouzauges

Government
  - Mayor (2020–2026): Eric Bernard
- Area^{1}: 20.13 km^{2} (7.77 sq mi)
- Highest elevation: 240 m (790 ft)
- Lowest elevation: 86 m (282 ft)
- Population (2023): 1,485
  - Density: 73.77/km^{2} (191.1/sq mi)
- Time zone: UTC+01:00 (CET)
  - Summer (DST): UTC+02:00 (CEST)
- INSEE/Postal code: 85140 /85700
- ^{1} French Land Register data, which excludes lakes, ponds, glaciers > 1 km^{2} (0.386 sq mi or 247 acres) and river estuaries.

La Meilleraie-Tillay (French pronunciation: [la mɛjʁɛ tijɛ]) is a commune in the Vendée department in the Pays de la Loire region in western France.

== Geography ==
The commune lies on the right bank of the river Lay, which forms all of the commune's southern border.

== See also ==
- Communes of the Vendée department
