= Tallud-Sainte-Gemme =

- Commune
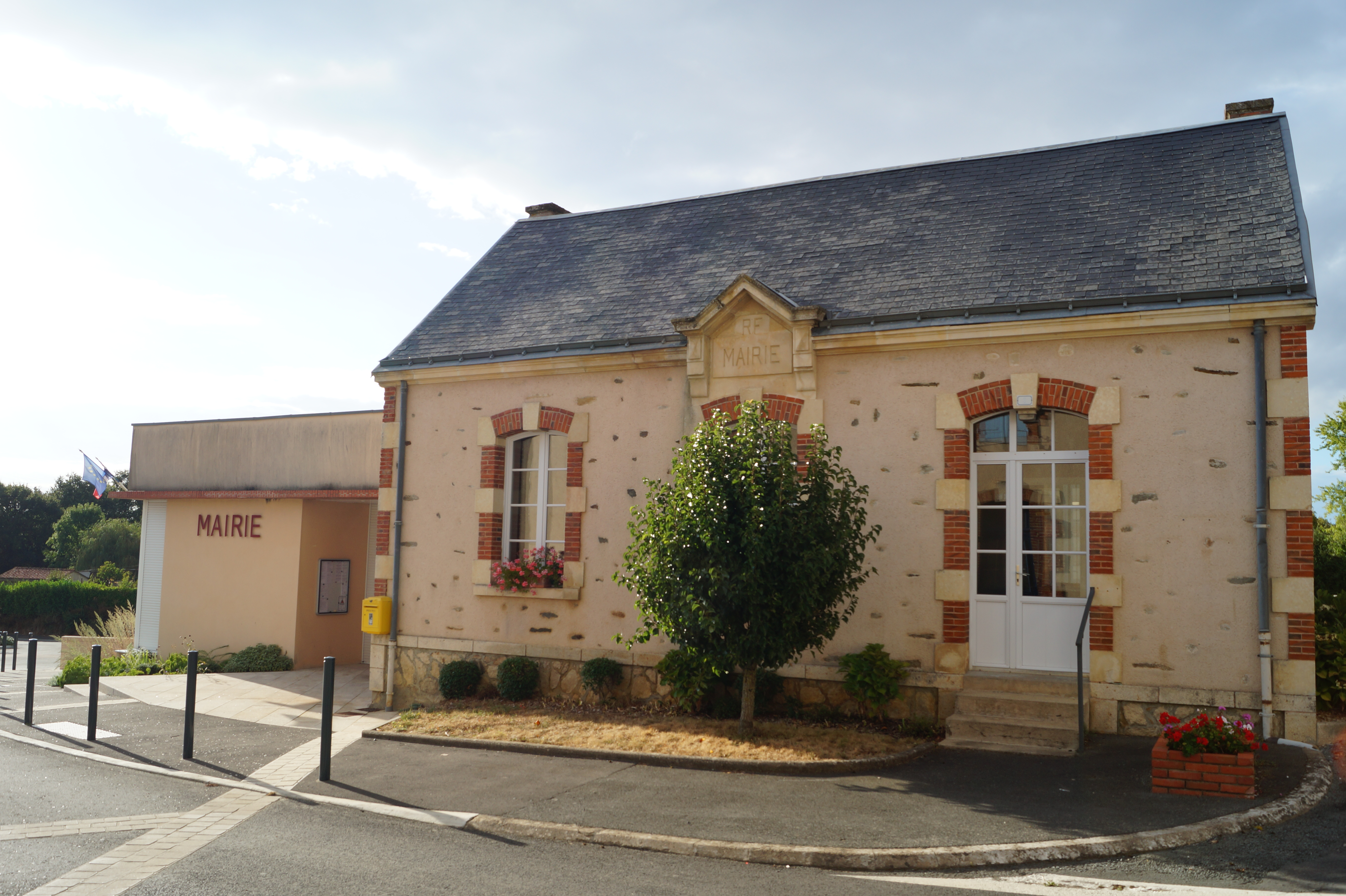
- Town hall of Tallud-Sainte-Gemme
- Location of Tallud-Sainte-Gemme
- Location within France Location within Pays de la Loire
- Coordinates: 46°41′14″N 0°53′02″W
- Country: France
- Region: Pays de la Loire
- Department: Vendée
- Arrondissement: Fontenay-le-Comte
- Canton: Les Herbiers
- Intercommunality: Pays de Pouzauges

Government
  - Mayor (2020–2026): Lionel Gazeau
- Area^{1}: 18.57 km^{2} (7.17 sq mi)
- Highest elevation: 142 m (466 ft)
- Lowest elevation: 50 m (160 ft)
- Population (2023): 453
  - Density: 24.4/km^{2} (63.2/sq mi)
- Time zone: UTC+01:00 (CET)
  - Summer (DST): UTC+02:00 (CEST)
- INSEE/Postal code: 85287 /85390
- ^{1} French Land Register data, which excludes lakes, ponds, glaciers > 1 km^{2} (0.386 sq mi or 247 acres) and river estuaries.

Tallud-Sainte-Gemme (French pronunciation: [taly sɛ̃t ʒɛm]) is a commune in the Vendée department in the Pays de la Loire region in western France.

== See also ==
- Communes of the Vendée department
