= L'Orbrie =

- Commune
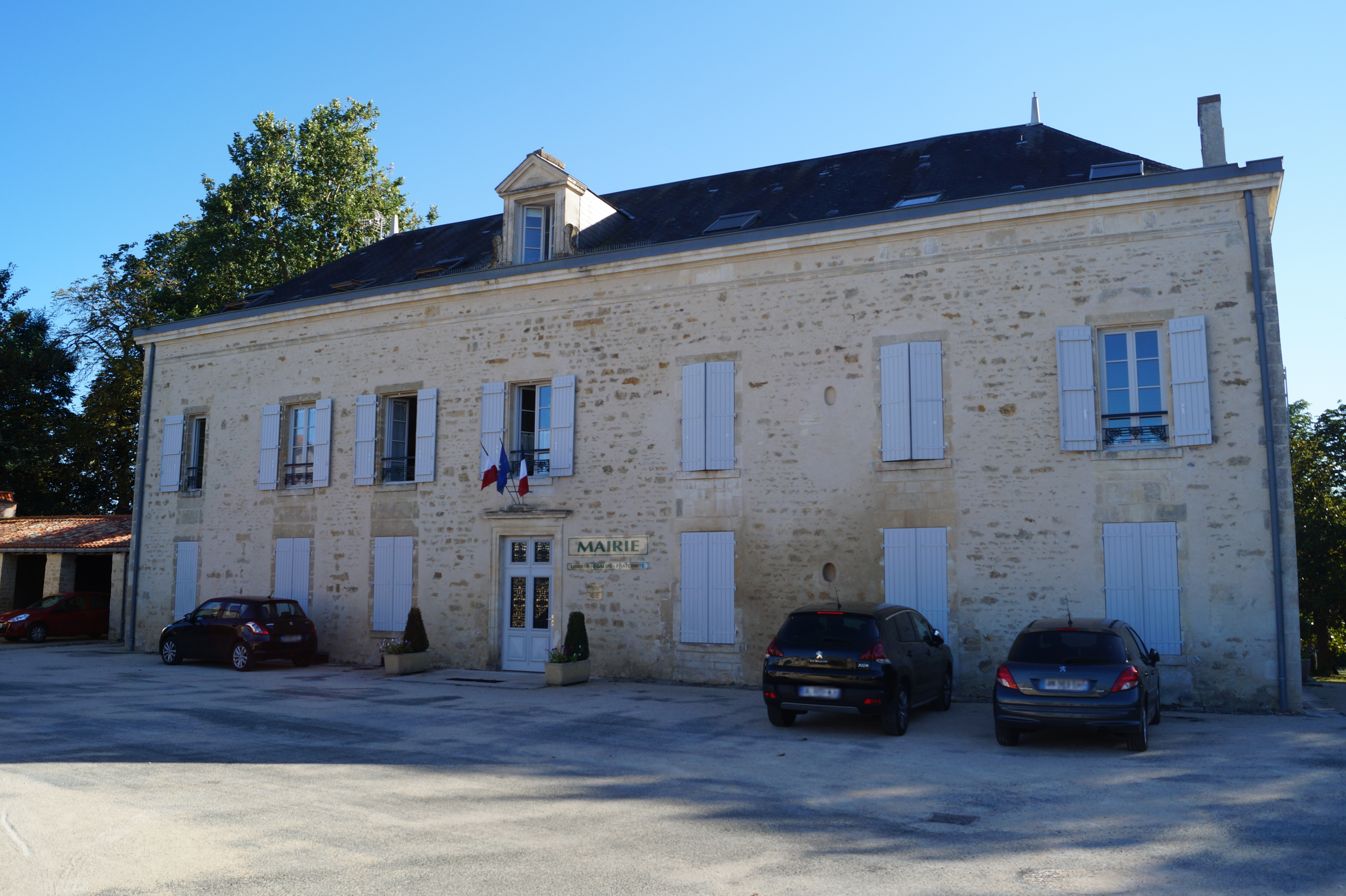
- Town hall of L'Orbrie

- Coat of arms
- Location of L'Orbrie
- Location within France Location within Pays de la Loire
- Coordinates: 46°29′23″N 0°47′02″W
- Country: France
- Region: Pays de la Loire
- Department: Vendée
- Arrondissement: Fontenay-le-Comte
- Canton: Fontenay-le-Comte

Government
  - Mayor (2020–2026): Noëlla Lucas
- Area^{1}: 9.63 km^{2} (3.72 sq mi)
- Highest elevation: 104 m (341 ft)
- Lowest elevation: 5 m (16 ft)
- Population (2023): 808
  - Density: 83.9/km^{2} (217/sq mi)
- Time zone: UTC+01:00 (CET)
  - Summer (DST): UTC+02:00 (CEST)
- INSEE/Postal code: 85167 /85200
- ^{1} French Land Register data, which excludes lakes, ponds, glaciers > 1 km^{2} (0.386 sq mi or 247 acres) and river estuaries.

L'Orbrie (French pronunciation: [lɔʁbʁi]) is a commune in the Vendée department in the Pays de la Loire region in western France.

== See also ==
- Communes of the Vendée department
