= Liez, Vendée =

Liez
- Commune
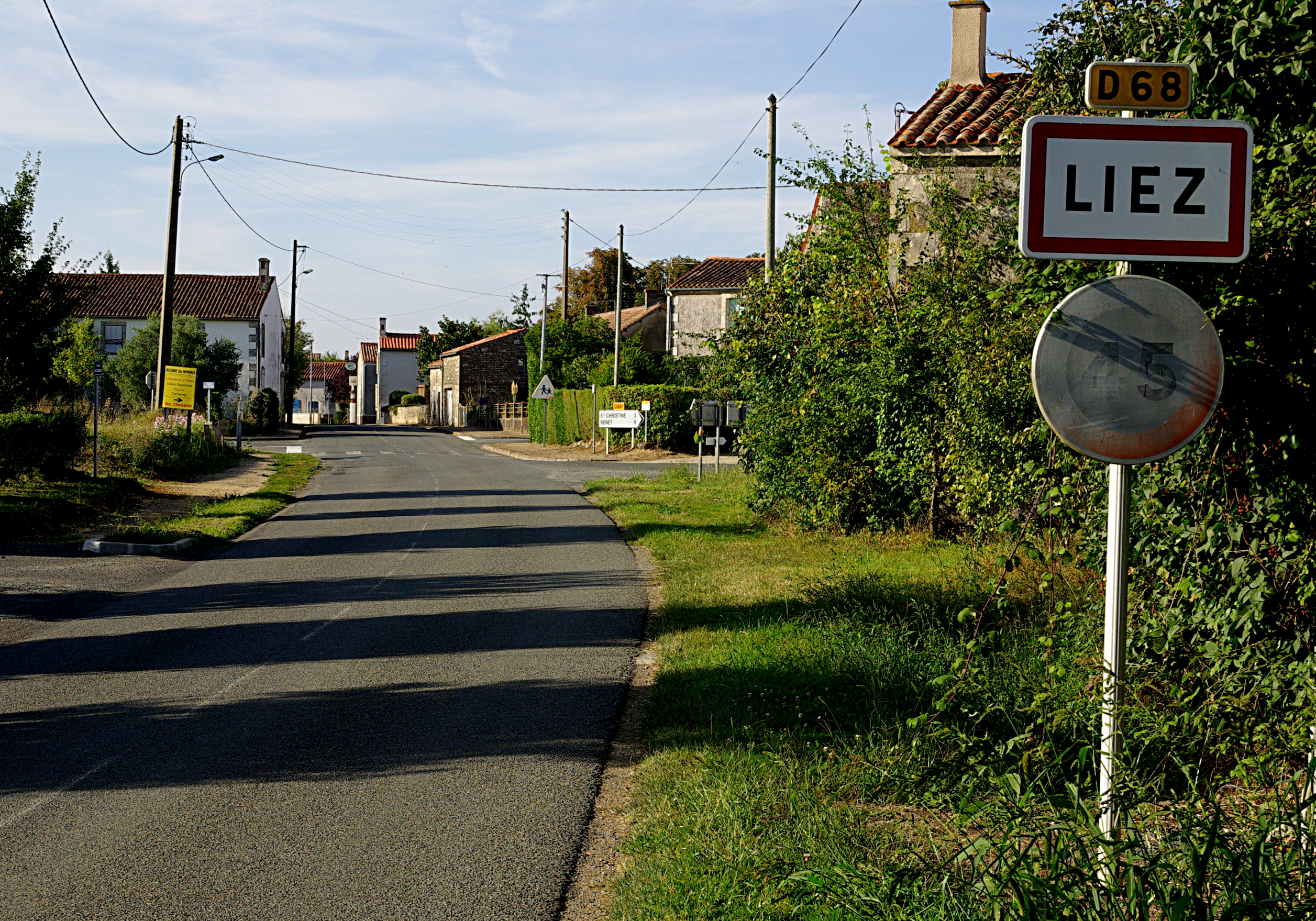
- The road into Liez

- Coat of arms
- Location of Liez
- Location within France Location within Pays de la Loire
- Coordinates: 46°22′13″N 0°42′07″W
- Country: France
- Region: Pays de la Loire
- Department: Vendée
- Arrondissement: Fontenay-le-Comte
- Canton: Fontenay-le-Comte
- Intercommunality: Vendée-Sèvre-Autise

Government
  - Mayor (2020–2026): Adeline Pouplin
- Area^{1}: 8.38 km^{2} (3.24 sq mi)
- Highest elevation: 15 m (49 ft)
- Lowest elevation: 1 m (3.3 ft)
- Population (2023): 302
  - Density: 36.0/km^{2} (93.3/sq mi)
- Demonym(s): Liézois, Liézoises
- Time zone: UTC+01:00 (CET)
  - Summer (DST): UTC+02:00 (CEST)
- INSEE/Postal code: 85123 /85420
- ^{1} French Land Register data, which excludes lakes, ponds, glaciers > 1 km^{2} (0.386 sq mi or 247 acres) and river estuaries.

Liez (French pronunciation: [lje]) is a commune in the Vendée department in the Pays de la Loire region in western France.

== See also ==
- Communes of the Vendée department
