= Saint-Étienne-de-Brillouet =

- Commune
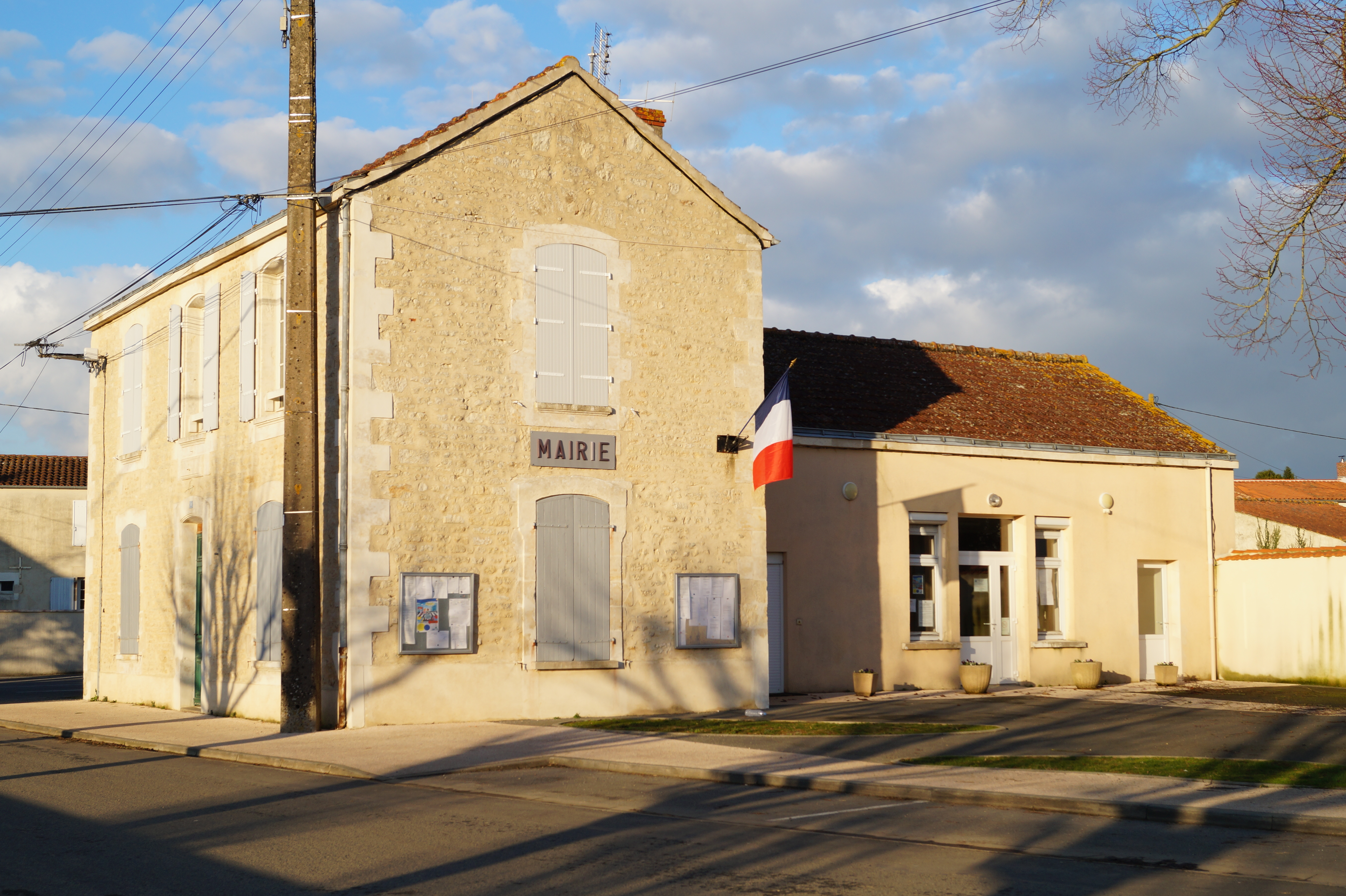
- Town hall of Saint-Étienne-de-Brillouet
- Location of Saint-Étienne-de-Brillouet
- Location within France Location within Pays de la Loire
- Coordinates: 46°31′30″N 0°59′54″W
- Country: France
- Region: Pays de la Loire
- Department: Vendée
- Arrondissement: Fontenay-le-Comte
- Canton: La Châtaigneraie

Government
  - Mayor (2020–2026): Jackie Marcheteau
- Area^{1}: 18.93 km^{2} (7.31 sq mi)
- Highest elevation: 60 m (200 ft)
- Lowest elevation: 19 m (62 ft)
- Population (2023): 616
  - Density: 32.5/km^{2} (84.3/sq mi)
- Time zone: UTC+01:00 (CET)
  - Summer (DST): UTC+02:00 (CEST)
- INSEE/Postal code: 85209 /85210
- ^{1} French Land Register data, which excludes lakes, ponds, glaciers > 1 km^{2} (0.386 sq mi or 247 acres) and river estuaries.

Saint-Étienne-de-Brillouet (French pronunciation: [sɛ̃t‿etjɛn də bʁilwɛ]) is a commune in the Vendée department in the Pays de la Loire region in western France.

== See also ==
- Communes of the Vendée department
