= Le Langon =

- Commune
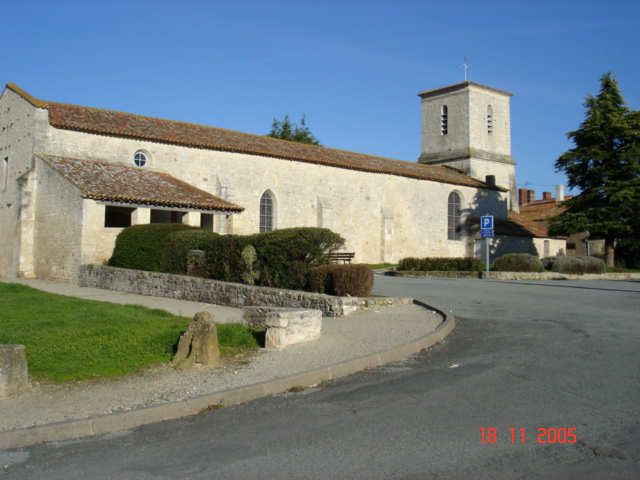
- The church in Le Langon
- Location of Le Langon
- Location within France Location within Pays de la Loire
- Coordinates: 46°26′19″N 0°56′55″W
- Country: France
- Region: Pays de la Loire
- Department: Vendée
- Arrondissement: Fontenay-le-Comte
- Canton: Fontenay-le-Comte
- Intercommunality: Pays de Fontenay-Vendée

Government
  - Mayor (2020–2026): Alain Bienvenu
- Area^{1}: 23.74 km^{2} (9.17 sq mi)
- Highest elevation: 39 m (128 ft)
- Lowest elevation: 0 m (0 ft)
- Population (2023): 1,045
  - Density: 44.02/km^{2} (114.0/sq mi)
- Time zone: UTC+01:00 (CET)
  - Summer (DST): UTC+02:00 (CEST)
- INSEE/Postal code: 85121 /85370
- ^{1} French Land Register data, which excludes lakes, ponds, glaciers > 1 km^{2} (0.386 sq mi or 247 acres) and river estuaries.

Le Langon (French pronunciation: [lə lɑ̃ɡɔ̃]) is a commune in the Vendée department in the Pays de la Loire region in western France.

== See also ==
- Communes of the Vendée department
