= Château-Guibert =

- Commune
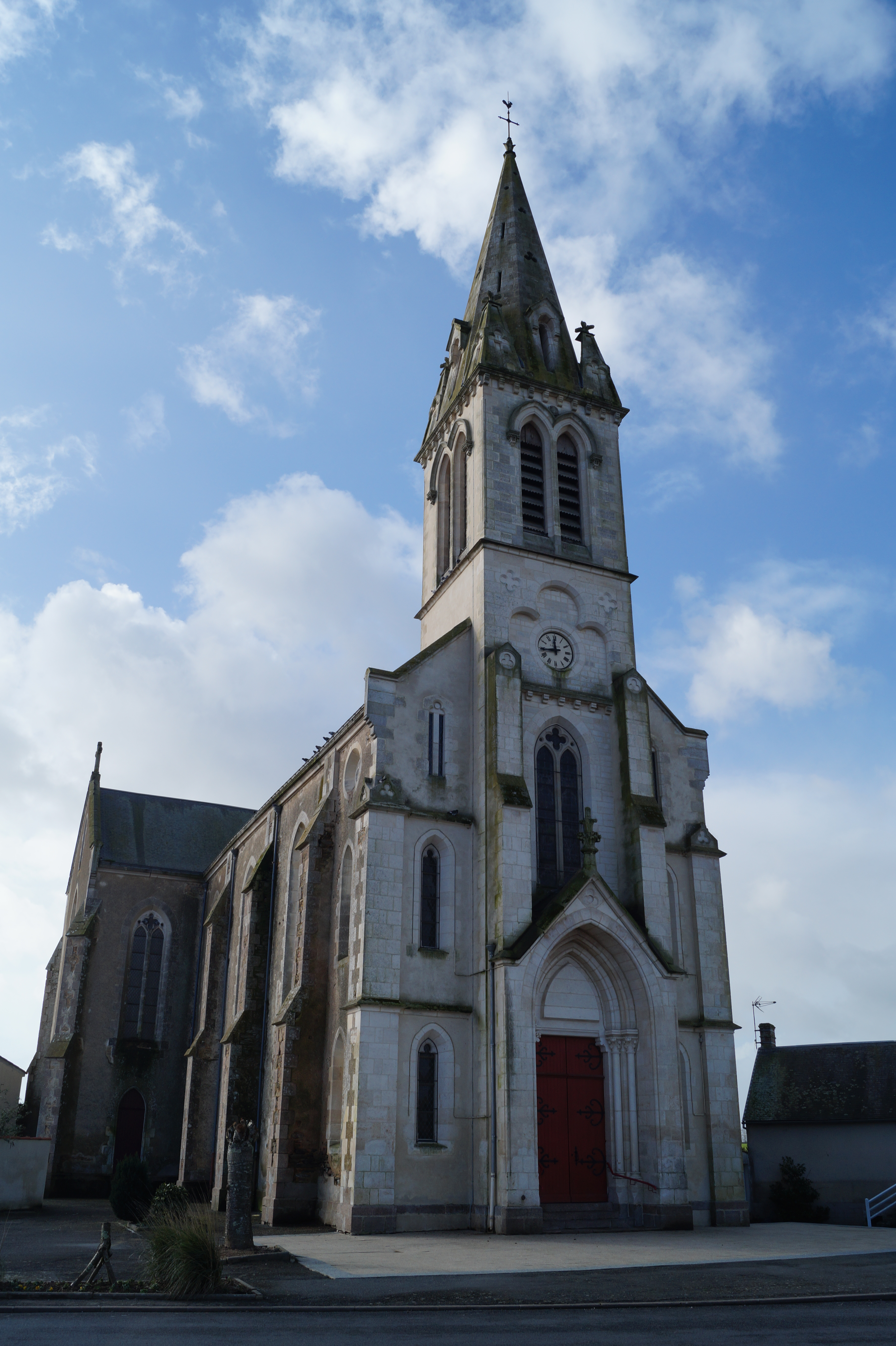

- Coat of arms
- Location of Château-Guibert
- Location within France Location within Pays de la Loire
- Coordinates: 46°34′57″N 1°14′06″W
- Country: France
- Region: Pays de la Loire
- Department: Vendée
- Arrondissement: Fontenay-le-Comte
- Canton: Mareuil-sur-Lay-Dissais

Government
  - Mayor (2020–2026): Philippe Berger
- Area^{1}: 35.16 km^{2} (13.58 sq mi)
- Highest elevation: 84 m (276 ft)
- Lowest elevation: 5 m (16 ft)
- Population (2023): 1,584
  - Density: 45.05/km^{2} (116.7/sq mi)
- Time zone: UTC+01:00 (CET)
  - Summer (DST): UTC+02:00 (CEST)
- INSEE/Postal code: 85061 /85320
- ^{1} French Land Register data, which excludes lakes, ponds, glaciers > 1 km^{2} (0.386 sq mi or 247 acres) and river estuaries.

Château-Guibert (French pronunciation: [ʃɑto ɡibɛʁ]) is a commune of the Vendée department in the Pays de la Loire region in western France.

== See also ==
- Communes of the Vendée department
