= Saint-Michel-le-Cloucq =

- Commune
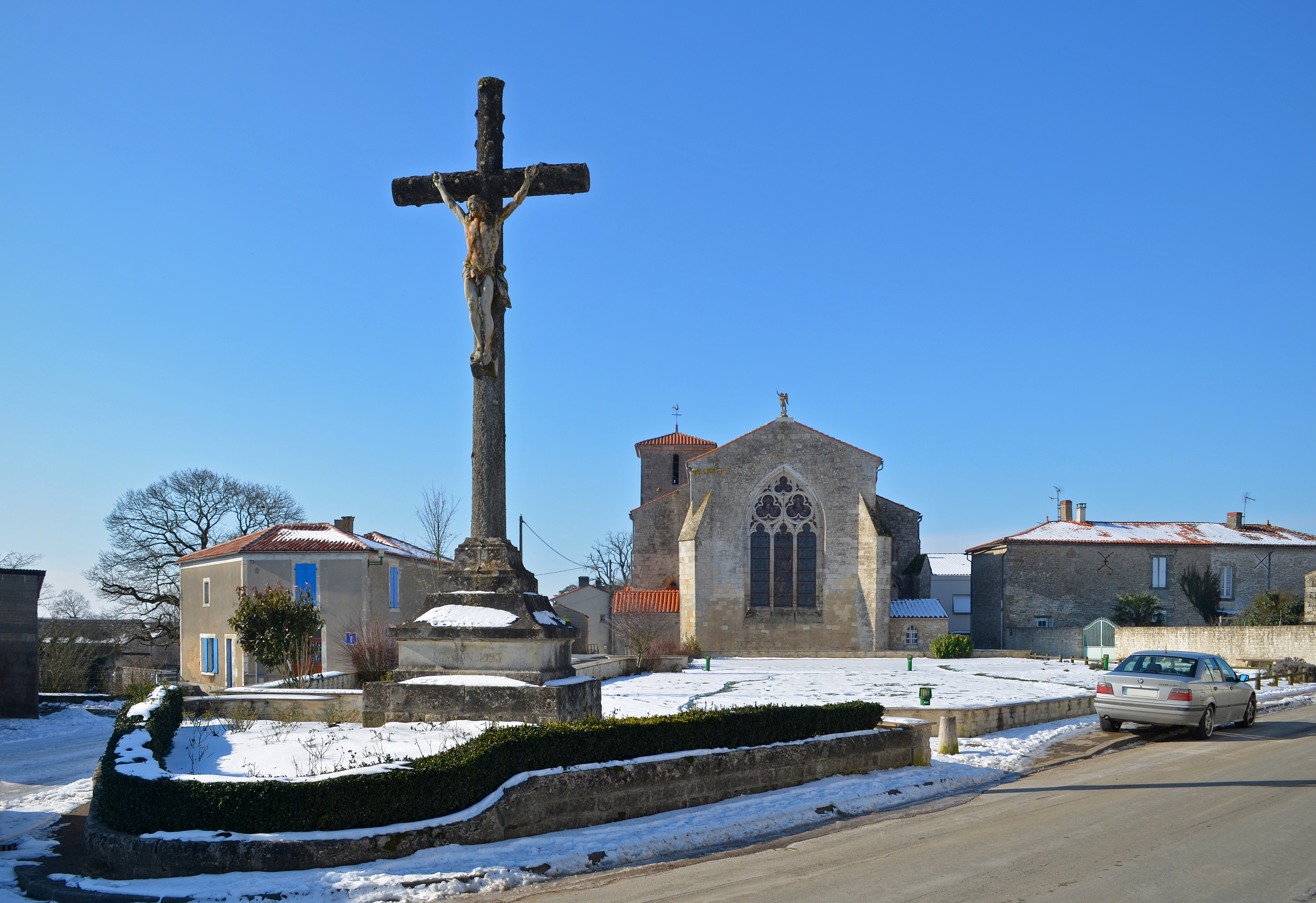
- The calvary and the church, in Saint-Michel-le-Cloucq

- Coat of arms
- Location of Saint-Michel-le-Cloucq
- Location within France Location within Pays de la Loire
- Coordinates: 46°29′07″N 0°45′07″W
- Country: France
- Region: Pays de la Loire
- Department: Vendée
- Arrondissement: Fontenay-le-Comte
- Canton: Fontenay-le-Comte
- Intercommunality: Pays de Fontenay-Vendée

Government
  - Mayor (2020–2026): Francis Guillon
- Area^{1}: 17.69 km^{2} (6.83 sq mi)
- Highest elevation: 107 m (351 ft)
- Lowest elevation: 10 m (33 ft)
- Population (2023): 1,253
  - Density: 70.83/km^{2} (183.5/sq mi)
- Time zone: UTC+01:00 (CET)
  - Summer (DST): UTC+02:00 (CEST)
- INSEE/Postal code: 85256 /85200
- ^{1} French Land Register data, which excludes lakes, ponds, glaciers > 1 km^{2} (0.386 sq mi or 247 acres) and river estuaries.

Saint-Michel-le-Cloucq (French pronunciation: [sɛ̃ miʃɛl lə kluk]) is a commune in the Vendée department in the Pays de la Loire region in western France.

== See also ==
- Communes of the Vendée department
