= Vix, Vendée =

Vix
- Commune
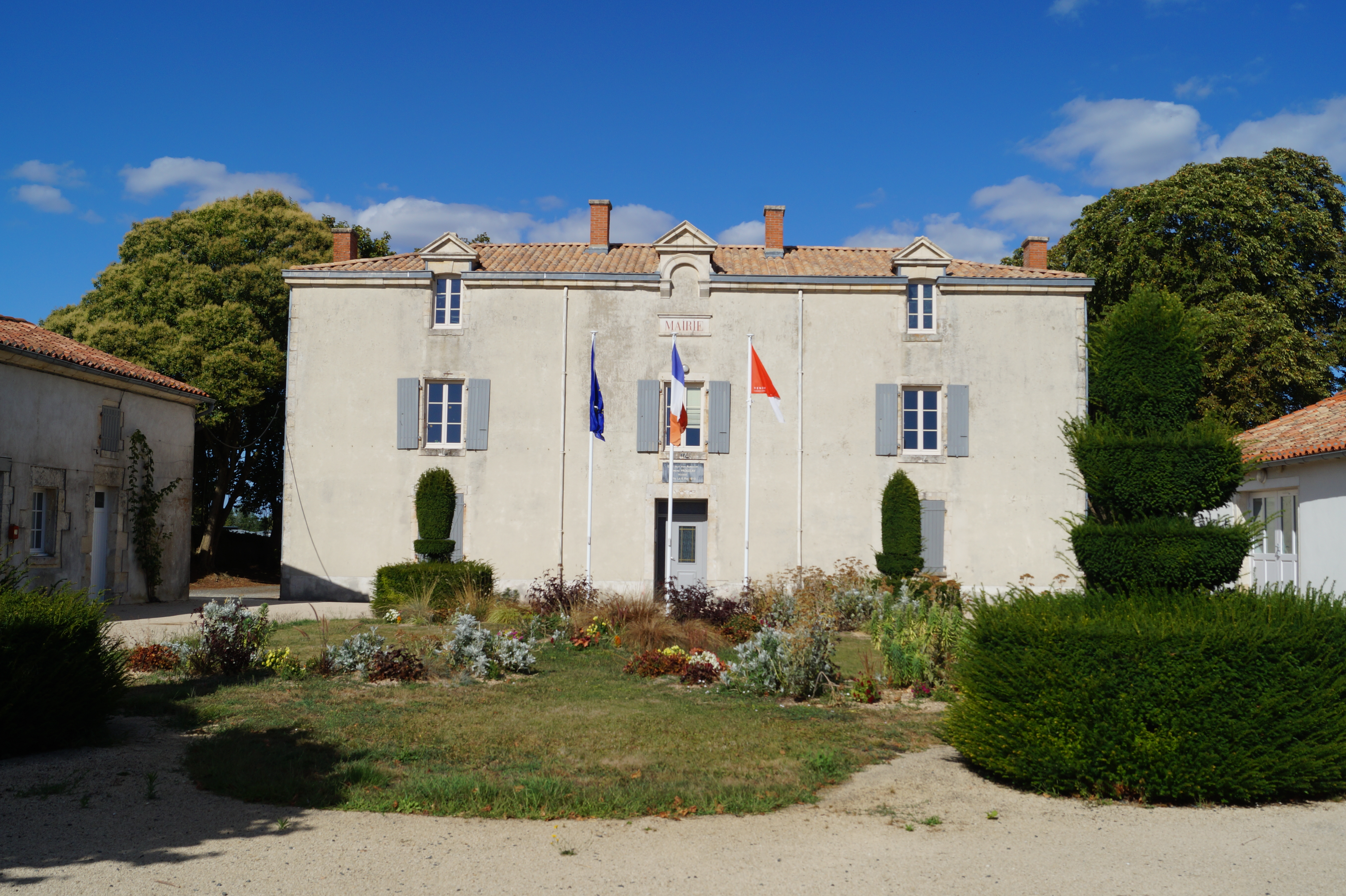
- Town hall of Vix
- Location of Vix
- Location within France Location within Pays de la Loire
- Coordinates: 46°21′53″N 0°51′30″W
- Country: France
- Region: Pays de la Loire
- Department: Vendée
- Arrondissement: Fontenay-le-Comte
- Canton: Fontenay-le-Comte
- Intercommunality: Vendée-Sèvre-Autise

Government
  - Mayor (2020–2026): Jean-Claude Chevallier
- Area^{1}: 28.53 km^{2} (11.02 sq mi)
- Elevation: 12 m (39 ft)
- Highest elevation: 34 m (112 ft)
- Lowest elevation: 0 m (0 ft)
- Population (2023): 1,835
  - Density: 64.32/km^{2} (166.6/sq mi)
- Time zone: UTC+01:00 (CET)
  - Summer (DST): UTC+02:00 (CEST)
- INSEE/Postal code: 85303 /85770
- ^{1} French Land Register data, which excludes lakes, ponds, glaciers > 1 km^{2} (0.386 sq mi or 247 acres) and river estuaries.

Vix (French pronunciation: [viks]) is a commune in the Vendée department in the Pays de la Loire region in western France.

== Notable inhabitants ==
- Gaston Chaissac (1910–1964) a French painter

== See also ==
- Communes of the Vendée department
