= Canton of Fontenay-le-Comte =

Coordinates: 46.46°N 0.80°W

The canton of Fontenay-le-Comte is an administrative division of the Vendée department, western France. Its borders were modified at the French canton reorganisation which came into effect in March 2015. Its seat is in Fontenay-le-Comte.

It consists of the following communes:

1. Auchay-sur-Vendée
2. Benet
3. Bouillé-Courdault
4. Damvix
5. Doix-lès-Fontaines
6. Faymoreau
7. Fontenay-le-Comte
8. Foussais-Payré
9. Le Langon
10. Liez
11. Longèves
12. Maillé
13. Maillezais
14. Le Mazeau
15. Mervent
16. Montreuil
17. L'Orbrie
18. Pissotte
19. Puy-de-Serre
20. Rives-d'Autise
21. Saint-Hilaire-des-Loges
22. Saint-Martin-de-Fraigneau
23. Saint-Michel-le-Cloucq
24. Saint-Pierre-le-Vieux
25. Saint-Sigismond
26. Les Velluire-sur-Vendée
27. Vix
28. Xanton-Chassenon
