= Armorial of the Communes of Vendée =

This page lists the armoury (emblazons=graphics and blazons=heraldic descriptions; or coats of arms) of the communes in la Vendée. (Department 85)

== Communes without arms ==
The following communes don't have official arms, according to the information received from the city halls by La Banque du Blason, who were kind enough to provide the list:

L'Aiguillon-sur-Vie, Antigny, Auzay, Avrillé, Bazoges-en-Paillers, Benet, Boufféré, Bouillé-Courdault, Boulogne, Bourneau, La Bretonnière-la-Claye, Breuil-Barret, Cezais, Chaillé-sous-les-Ormeaux, La Chaize-Giraud, Chambretaud, Champagné-les-Marais, La Chapelle-Achard, La Chapelle-aux-Lys, La Chapelle-Hermier, La Chapelle-Palluau, La Chapelle-Thémer, Chasnais, Château-d'Olonne, Châteauneuf, Chavagnes-les-Redoux, Cheffois, Corpe, La Couture, Damvix, Doix, Dompierre-sur-Yon, Faymoreau, Le Fenouiller, La Ferrière, Fontaines, Fougeré, Froidfond, Le Girouard, Givrand, Grosbreuil, Grues, La Guérinière, L'Île-d'Elle, La Jaudonnière, Lairoux, Landevieille, Le Langon, Liez, Loge-Fougereuse, Les Magnils-Reigniers, Maillé, Marillet, Marsais-Sainte-Radégonde, Martinet, Le Mazeau, La Meilleraie-Tillay, Menomblet, La Merlatière, Mervent, Montreuil, Moreilles, Mormaison, Mouchamps, Moutiers-sur-le-Lay, Mouzeuil-Saint-Martin, Nalliers, Nieul-sur-l'Autise, Notre-Dame-de-Riez, Olonne-sur-Mer, Oulmes, Péault, Petosse, Les Pineaux, Pissotte, Poiroux, Pouillé, Puy-de-Serre, Puyravault, Rosnay, Saint-André-Goule-d'Oie, Saint-André-Treize-Voies, Saint-Aubin-la-Plaine, Saint-Cyr-des-Gâts, Saint-Denis-du-Payré, Sainte-Florence, Sainte-Foy, Sainte-Pexine, Saint-Étienne-de-Brillouet, Saint-Georges-de-Pointindoux, Saint-Germain-l'Aiguiller, Saint-Gervais, Saint-Hilaire-de-Voust, Saint-Hilaire-la-Forêt, Saint-Jean-de-Beugné, Saint-Juire-Champgillon, Saint-Julien-des-Landes, Saint-Laurent-de-la-Salle, Saint-Maixent-sur-Vie, Saint-Malô-du-Bois, Saint-Mars-la-Réorthe, Saint-Martin-de-Fraigneau, Saint-Martin-des-Fontaines, Saint-Martin-Lars-en-Sainte-Hermine, Saint-Michel-en-l'Herm, Saint-Michel-Mont-Mercure, Saint-Paul-Mont-Penit, Saint-Pierre-du-Chemin, Saint-Révérend, Saint-Sigismond, Saint-Urbain, Saint-Valérien, Saint-Vincent-sur-Jard, Saligny, Sallertaine, Sérigné, Le Tablier, La Taillée, Tallud-Sainte-Gemme, Thiré, Thouarsais-Bouildroux, Triaize, Venansault, Vendrennes, Vix, Vouillé-les-Marais, Vouvant, Xanton-Chassenon. (non exhaustive list)

== A ==
Image	Name of Commune	French original blazon	English blazon
	L'Aiguillon-sur-Mer	D'azur au lion couronné d'or.	
	Aizenay	D'hermine au chef de gueules.	
	Angles	D'or aux trois bandes de sable, à l'écusson de gueules aux cinq tours d'argent ouvertes aussi de sable et ordonnées en sautoir, brochant sur le tout, au chef aussi de gueules chargé de la "bête d'Angles" passante d'argent, accostée à dextre d'une crosse d'or issant du trait du chef et à senestre d'une épée du même.	
	Apremont	De gueules au lion d'or, couronné d'azur.	
	Aubigny	Écartelé : au premier, de gueules aux trois croissants d'or; au deuxième, de gueules aux trois tours d'or, ouvertes de sable, mal ordonnées; au troisième, d'argent à la croix de gueules cantonnée de quatre coquilles de sable; au quatrième, de gueules aux six besants d'argent ordonnés 3, 2 et 1; sur le tout d'azur à l'église romane Saint Laurent d'Aubigny d'argent posée sur une motte de sinople.	

== B ==
Image	Name of Commune	French original blazon	English blazon
	Barbâtre	Coupé ondé d'azur et d'or, au soleil non figuré de l'un en l'autre.	Party per fess wavy azure and or, a sun without face counter-charged.
	La Barre-de-Monts	D'or à la barre d'azur accompagnée à dextre de trois monts de sable mouvant du flanc et de la partition et portant trois pins au naturel, et à senestre d'un vaisseau de gueules équipé d'argent voguant sur une mer ondée de sinople.	
	Bazoges-en-Pareds	D'azur au donjon du lieu d'or, surmonté d'une trangle du même fleurdelysée de trois pièces des deux côtés.	
	Beaufou		
	Beaulieu-sous-la-Roche	Écartelé : au premier, de gueules aux cinq tours d'or ordonnées en sautoir; au deuxième, d'azur aux trois fleurs de lys d'or, à la bordure cousue de gueules; au troisième, d'argent à la croix ancrée de gueules, à la bordure de sable chargée de huit besants d'or; au quatrième, gironné de vair et de gueules de douze pièces; à la croix d'argent chargée d'un bâton prieural au naturel posé en pal, brochant sur l'écartelé.	
	Beaurepaire	D'azur aux trois chevrons d'or.	
	Beauvoir-sur-Mer	D'azur à la nef d'argent voguant sur des ondes du même mouvant de la pointe, à la voile carrée d'or chargée d'une croix partie de gueules et de sable, au pennon aussi d'argent.	
	Belleville-sur-Vie	Gironné de gueules et de vair de douze pièces.	Gironny of twelve gules and vair.
	Le Bernard	Écartelé : au premier de sinople à la croix d'or remplie de gueules, au deuxième et au troisième d'or plain, au quatrième de sinople à l'ours en pied d'or lampassé de gueules.	
	La Bernardière		
	Bessay	De sable à quatre fusée d'argent accollées et posées en bande.	
	La Boissière-de-Montaigu	Parti : au premier d'argent aux trois fasces d'azur, au second d'azur semé de fleurs de lys d'or aux trois écussons d'argent brochant sur le tout; le tout sommé d'un chef d'or chargé de trois buis de sinople.	
	Bois-de-Céné	Écartelé : au premier d'azur à la moucheture d'hermine d'or, au deuxième de sinople à l'arbre d'argent, au troisième de sinople à la tour d'argent, maçonnée de sable et ouverte du champ, au quatrième d'azur à la fleur de lis d'or; sur le tout, d'or au cœur vidé, couronné et croiseté de sinople.	
	La Boissière-des-Landes	Parti : au premier, d'azur au chevron d'or accompagné de trois trèfles du même; au second, d'or au chevron de gueules accompagné de trois aigles d'azur, becquées et membrées aussi de gueules; le tout sommé d'un chef d'argent chargé d'une croisette de Malte de gueules accostée de deux quintefeuilles de sinople.	
	Bouin	De gueules à la nef d'or, grée et mâtée du même, avec une voile et un pennon d'argent, voguant sur une mer de sinople, cantonnée à dextre en chef d'une étoile aussi d'or posée en bande.	
	Le Boupère	D'azur à la fasce haussée d'argent fuselée de sept pièces de gueules, accompagnée en pointe d'une chapelle-château de deux tours d'argent couverte, ouverte et ajourée de sable, à la filière d'or.	
	Bournezeau	Écartelé : au premier et au quatrième, d'azur au bourg d'or; au deuxième, de gueules au pairle ondé d'argent; au troisième, d'argent aux trois croisettes de gueules.	
	Brem-sur-Mer	Écartelé : au premier d'or au manteau gonfaloné d'azur chargé d'une épée du champ, au deuxième de gueules à la chapelle campanée d'argent, ouverte et ajourée de sable, au troisième de gueules au bateau de sable, habillé et flammé d'argent, au quatrième d'or à la grappe de raisin de gueules, tigée et feuillée de sinople.	
	Bretignolles-sur-Mer	D'azur à l'écusson d'argent aux trois chevrons de gueules, surmonté d'un chapeau de cardinal de gueules.	
	Les Brouzils	Coupé : au premier d'argent au chêne de sinople englanté d'or, au second d'or au loup passant de sable.	
	La Bruffière	D'azur aux trois mâcles d'or accompagnées de trois fleurs de lys du même mal ordonnées.	

== C ==
Image	Name of Commune	French original blazon	English blazon
	La Caillère-Saint-Hilaire	Écartelé : au premier, d'argent au sautoir de gueules; au deuxième, de sinople à la tour d'or; au troisième, d'or au cerisier de sinople, fruité de gueules, accosté de deux buissons d'épines aussi de sinople, le tout terrassé de sable; au quatrième, d'azur aux six cailles d'or ordonnées 3, 2 et 1.	
	Chaillé-les-Marais	Écartelé : au premier d'or au château de gueules, ouvert et ajouré du champ, maçonné de sable, au deuxième d'azur à l'île d'argent, au troisième d'azur à l'anguille d'argent ondoyant en pal, au quatrième d'or à la fasce fuselée de gueules de cinq pièces.	
	Chaix	Écartelé en sautoir : au premier, de sable à la couronne de baron d'or accompagnée de trois croisettes pattées d'argent; au deuxième, d'argent au chêne arraché de sinople englanté d'or; au troisième, d'argent au drakkar contourné de gueules, bordé de tampons d'or; au quatrième, de sinople à la champagne ondée d'argent.	
	La Chaize-le-Vicomte	De gueules aux trois écussons ovales, celui en pointe couché, le premier cousu d'azur à l'arbre arraché d'argent, accosté de deux croissants affrontés du même, surmonté d'une fleur de lys d'or, le deuxième gironné de sable et d'argent de huit pièces, le troisième cousu d'azur à la croix de Saint Louis d'or.	
	Challans	D'azur au chaland d'or, habillé et flammé d'argent, accompagné en chef à dextre d'une étoile aussi d'or et à senestre d'une tour du même ouverte du champ.	
	Le Champ-Saint-Père	Tiercé en pairle renversé : au 1er de sinople à la roue de moulin d'argent, au 2e d'or à la grappe de raisin de gueules, tigée et feuillée de sinople, au 3e d'argent au bouquet de quatre épis de blés d'or, feuillés de sinople et au soleil non figuré de gueules mouvant de la pointe; au compas ouvert de tenné brochant en chevron sur la partition et touchant les bords de l'écu.	
	Chantonnay	D'azur à la gerbe de blé d'or.	
	La Châtaigneraie	D'argent au lion d'azur semé de fleurs de lys d'or.	
	Château-Guibert	Écartelé : au premier, de gueules à la croix de Malte d'argent; au deuxième, d'azur aux deux clefs d'argent passées en sautoir; au troisième, d'azur à la fasce d'argent chargée de trois étoiles de gueules; au quatrième, de gueules à la croix double d'argent.	
	Les Châtelliers-Châteaumur	D'argent à l'aigle de sable, becquée, lampassée et membrée de gueules, à la bordure soudée d'or chargée de neuf merlettes aussi de sable ordonnées en orle, au franc-canton aussi de gueules.	
	Chauché	De sinople à la tour cousue de gueules, surmontée de l'inscription « CHAUCHÉ » en lettres capitales cousues de sable, au cadran solaire en triangle d'or mouvant de la pointe brochant sur la tour.	
	Chavagnes-en-Paillers	Parti : au premier, mi-parti gironné de vair et de gueules de dix pièces; au second, d'azur aux deux crosses adossées d'argent, la première posée en bande et la seconde contournée posée en barre.	
	Les Clouzeaux	D'azur aux dix billettes d'argent ordonnées 4, 3, 2 et 1, aux trois abeilles d'or, le tout enfermé dans un orle du même.	
	Coëx	De gueules au lion couronné d'or.	
	Commequiers	Coupé : au premier, parti : au premier d'or aux deux clefs de sable passées en sautoir et au second de gueules au dolmen d'argent; au second, d'azur au château d'argent, ajouré et maçonné de sable, surmonté d'une couronne de baron d'or.	
	La Copechagnière		
	Cugand	De gueules à l'aigle d'argent, becquée et membrée d'azur.	
	Curzon	D'azur au pont de trois arches d'argent, maçonné de sable, mouvant des flancs et de la pointe, surmonté de trois clochers d'or ordonnés 2 et 1.	

== E ==
Image	Name of Commune	French original blazon	English blazon
	L'Épine	D'azur au vaisseau d'or, le petit hunier chargé d'un cœur vendéen de gueules, voguant sur une mer d'argent, surmonté de cinq casques aussi d'or tarés de profil ordonnés en chevron, chapé du même chargé à dextre d'une colombe contournée du champ et à senestre d'une couleuvre du même posée en pal.	
	Les Épesse	Coupé, au I parti de gueules à trois macles d'argent ordonnées 2 et 1 et d'or au double coeur vidé, couronné et croiseté de gueules, au II d'or au chêne de sinople.	
	Les Essarts	D'hermine au chef de gueules chargé d'une grappe de raisin d'argent, feuillée de sinople, accostée de deux épis de blé d'or mouvant du trait du chef.	

== F ==
Image	Name of Commune	French original blazon	English blazon
	Falleron	De sinople à la croix recercelée d'or, au chef ondé d'argent.	
	La Faute-sur-Mer	Parti d'or et d'azur au soleil non-figuré de gueules chargé d'un bateau d'or à deux voiles cousues d'azur, brochant sur la partition.	
	La Flocellière	D'azur à la tour d'argent, maçonnée de sable, accostée de deux fleurs de lys d'or, au chef aussi d'argent chargé de trois merlettes de sable.	
	Fontenay-le-Comte	D'azur à la fontaine jaillissante de trois pièces d'argent au bassin maçonné de sable.	
	Foussais-Payré	Parti : au premier, d'azur aux deux clefs d'or passées en sautoir; au second, d'argent aux deux étoiles de gueules rangées en fasce, soutenues d'un croissant du même.	

== G ==
Image	Name of Commune	French original blazon	English blazon
	La Garnache	Parti : au premier d'or aux sept merlettes d'azur ordonnées en orle, au franc-quartier de gueules, au second coupé au I parti d'argent à la moucheture d'hermine de sable et d'or à la fleur de lys d'azur, et au II d'azur à l'ostensoir d'or.	
	La Gaubretière	D'or au lévrier de sable surmonté de trois trèfles de sinople rangés en chef, à la filière aussi de sable.	
	La Génétouze	D'azur aux deux crosses d'argent passées en sautoir, cantonnées de quatre fleurs de lys d'or, au chef cousu de gueules chargé d'une mitre aussi d'argent accostée de deux léopards affrontés aussi d'or.	
	Le Givre	Tiercé en pairle : au premier, de gueules à la mitre d'or; au second, d'azur au château d'argent, ouvert et couvert de sable; au troisième, d'or à la bisse de sinople ondoyante en pal.	
	Grand'Landes	D'argent à un épi de blé d'or, soutenu d'un double pampre de sinople posé en chevron renversé, chaussé du même chargé à dextre d'un cœur vendéen du champ et à senestre d'une tête de buse arrachée du même.	
	Le Gué-de-Velluire	Écartelé : au premier, d'azur au prieuré d'argent, ouvert et ajouré de gueules; au deuxième, d'argent au rocher de sable mouvant du flanc dextre et de la pointe; au troisième, d'argent à la boucle de gueules; au quatrième, de sinople à la rivière d'argent posée en bande, au gué pavé de sable.	
	La Guyonnière	De sinople au lion couronné d'or, armé et lampassé de gueules.	

== H ==
Image	Name of Commune	French original blazon	English blazon
	L'Herbergement	Parti : au premier, d'azur au cerf arrêté d'or; au second, de gueules aux quatre fusées d'or accolées en fasce, accompagnées de huit besants du même rangés, quatre en chef et quatre en pointe; à l'épée haute d'argent garnie d'or brochant sur la partition.	
	Les Herbiers	De gueules aux trois fasces d'or.	
	L'Hermenault	De gueules aux deux clefs d'argent passées en sautoir, au chef d'hermine.	

== I ==
Image	Name of Commune	French original blazon	English blazon
	L'Île-d'Olonne	D'azur au bateau cousu de sinople, à la voile latine cousue de gueules, accompagné en chef de deux triangles d'argent, soutenu d'un marais salant du même mouvant de la pointe et des flancs en perspective fuyante.	
	L'Île d'Yeu	D'or à la fasce ondée d'azur.	

== J ==
Image	Name of Commune	French original blazon	English blazon
	Jard-sur-Mer	D'argent à l'écusson de gueules à l'abbaye de Lieu Dieu d'argent, maçonnée de sable, au comble d'azur chargé d'un soleil non figuré d'or, à la champagne de sinople.	
	La Jonchère	D'or à la touffe de joncs de sinople, au chef d'azur chargé d'une cigogne contournée d'argent, becquée et membrée de sable, accostée de deux fleurs de lys du même.	

== L ==
Image	Name of Commune	French original blazon	English blazon
	Landeronde	Parti de gueules et d'argent aux deux renards rampants de l'un et de l'autre affrontés sur la ligne de partition, enté en pointe de sinople à la branche de cinq rameaux d'ajoncs d'or.	
	Les Landes-Genusson	D'azur au lion d'or, lampassé et couronné de gueules.	
	Longèves	D'azur à la fasce ondée d'argent, accompagnée en chef de deux clefs d'or passées en sautoir et en pointe d'une épée haute aussi d'argent garnie aussi d'or.	
	Longeville-sur-Mer	De gueules à la barre cousue de sinople.	
	Luçon	De gueules au brochet d'argent posé en pal.	
	Les Lucs-sur-Boulogne	De gueules à la fasce ondée d'argent chargée d'une couronne princière soudée d'or, au franc-canton d'argent chargé d'une croix partie d'or et de sinople.	

== M ==
Image	Name of Commune	French original blazon	English blazon
	Maché	Taillé de sinople et d'argent chargé d'une caille au naturel soutenue par trois divises ondées d'azur en pointe et accompagnée en chef au canton dextre d'un double cœur vidé, croiseté et couronné cousu de gueules.	
	Maillezais	De gueules, à deux clefs d'argent posées en sautoir.	
	Mallièvre	Coupé : au premier, parti : au premier d'argent à la croix alésée pattée de gueules et au second de gueules à la tour d'argent, ouverte, ajourée et maçonnée de sable; au second, d'argent au double cœur vidé, couronné et croiseté de gueules.	
	Mareuil-sur-Lay-Dissais	D'or, au chevron de gueules, accompagné de trois aiglettes d'azur, becquées et membrées de gueules.	
	Mesnard-la-Barotière	D'argent fretté de six pièces d'azur, au franc-canton de gueules chargé d'une barre d'or.	
	Monsireigne	De gueules à la sirène d'argent, se regardant dans un miroir du même, posée sur une trangle ondée d'azur bordée aussi d'argent, accompagnée en chef à dextre d'une croisette d'or et à senestre d'une fleur de lys du même défaillante à senestre.	
	Montaigu	De vair au griffon de gueules.	
	Montournais	D'argent à la montagne de deux pics de sinople, celui de dextre plus petit, à la divise d'azur brochant à dextre et disparaissant à senestre, au soleil levant d'or.	
	Mortagne-sur-Sèvre	D'azur au cerf d'or passant sur une divise du même.	
	La Mothe-Achard	D'azur au lion d'argent, armé et lampassé de gueules, aux deux fasces alésées cousues du même brochant sur le tout.	
	Mouilleron-en-Pareds	De gueules au moulin à vent d'or, posé sur un tertre de sinople, accosté de deux clefs renversées et adossées d'argent, au chef cousu d'azur chargé de trois étoiles aussi d'argent.	
	Mouilleron-le-Captif	De sable aux trois chevrons d'argent, accompagnés en chef à dextre d'une étoile d'or et à senestre d'un croissant aussi d'argent, et en pointe d'une moucheture d'hermine du même, mantelé cousu d'azur chargé de quatre fleurs de lys d'or, deux à dextre l'une sur l'autre et deux à senestre l'une sur l'autre, au comble ondé du même.	
	Moutiers-les-Mauxfaits	D'azur à la foi d'or, accompagnée en pointe d'une coquille d'argent.	

== N ==
Image	Name of Commune	French original blazon	English blazon
	Nalliers	Parti : écartelé en sautoir : au premier d'argent au vase de deux anse d’or, deuxième d'azur à la face d’une tête de bœuf d’or, au troisième d'argent au moulin à vent d’or, au quatrième d'azur à la face d’une tête de cheval d’or.	
	Nesmy	Parti : au premier, d'azur à la croix alésée pattée d'argent; au second, d'or au pot d'une anse de gueules; le tout sommé d'un chef de sinople chargé de trois tours d'or, ouvertes, ajourées et maçonnées de sable.	
	Nieul-le-Dolent	D'azur au lion d'or, armé et lampassé de gueules, chargé sur le flanc d'une croisette pattée de sinople, à la filière cousue de sable.	
	Noirmoutier-en-l'Île	Écartelé : au 1er de gueules à la croix d'argent perronnée de quatre pièces, au 2e de sinople à la croix écartelée d'or et d'azur, au 3e d'azur à la croix partie d'or et de sinople, au 4e de vair à la croix écartelée d'argent et de sable.	
	Notre-Dame-de-Monts	D'azur au mont de trois coupeaux d'or, posé sur une champagne ondée de sinople, surmonté d'une étoile d'argent.	

== O ==
Image	Name of Commune	French original blazon	English blazon
	L'Oie	D'azur à l'oie d'or, becquée et membrée de gueules, adextrée en chef de deux épées d'argent passées en sautoir.	
	L'Orbrie	Parti : au premier, d'or aux trois chabots de gueules; au second, mi-parti gironné de gueules et d'argent de huit pièces, les girons d'argent chargés de trois fasces aussi de gueules; au peuplier d'argent mouvant de la pointe brochant sur le parti.	

== P ==
Image	Name of Commune	French original blazon	English blazon
	Palluau	De gueules au château de deux tours couvertes d'or, à la bordure burelée d'argent et de sable de dix pièces.	
	Le Perrier	De sinople à la fasce ondée d'argent sur laquelle est posée une yole et ses deux passagers, maraîchine assise et maraîchin ninglant, le tout d'argent, accompagnée en pointe d'une croix fleurdelysée d'or.	
	Le Poiré-sur-Velluire	Taillé : au premier, d'azur au château d'or, ouvert et ajouré de gueules, maçonné de sable; au second, de sinople au portail de chapelle d'argent, croiseté et maçonné de sable; à la traverse ondée d'argent brochant sur la partition; le tout sommé d'un chef cousu de sable chargé de trois croisettes pattées d'argent.	
	Le Poiré-sur-Vie	D'azur à la croix écartelée d'argent et de vair, cantonnée au premier d'une clef d'or.	
	La Pommeraie-sur-Sèvre	D'azur aux trois pommes feuillées d'or, mal ordonnées, soutenues d'un pont d'une arche du même mouvant des flancs, à la bordure cousue de gueules chargée en chef d'une tour donjonnée de trois tourelles aussi d'or.	
	Pouzauges	D'or à l'épée haute d'argent, accostée de dix fleurs de lys de sable, cinq à dextre et cinq à senestre ordonnées en sautoir.	

== R ==
Image	Name of Commune	French original blazon	English blazon
	La Rabatelière	D'argent aux sept merlettes de sable ordonnées 3, 3 et 1.	
	Réaumur	D'azur à la bande d'argent, accompagnée en chef d'une chapelle d'argent, maçonnée de sable, en perspective, portail à senestre, et en pointe d'une fleur de lys d'or.	
	La Réorthe	Taillé : au premier, de gueules au château d'or, ouvert et ajouré du champ, maçonné de sable; au second, de sinople à la rothe d'or posée en barre; à la traverse ondée d'argent brochant sur la partition; le tout surmonté d'un chef d'argent chargé de quatre croisettes d'azur.	
	La Roche-sur-Yon	De gueules à une ville d'argent sur un rocher de sinople accompagnée en chef d'une foi d'or, au franc-canton des villes de second ordre, qui est à dextre, d'azur à la lettre capitale N d'or.	
	Rocheservière	De gueules à la croix partie d'or et de sable.	
	Rochetrejoux	Coupé : au premier, d'azur au mont alésé de six coupeaux d'argent; au second, parti bandé contre-bandé d'or et de gueules.	

== S ==
Image	Name of Commune	French original blazon	English blazon
	Les Sables-d'Olonne	D'azur au vaisseau équipé et habillé d'argent voguant sur une mer de sinople mouvant de la pointe, surmonté de la Vierge aussi d'argent, les bras croisés sur la poitrine et au voile mouvant à senestre, posée sur une nuée du même, accostée de deux chérubins aux ailes déployées d'argent cantonnés l'un en barre à dextre, l'autre en bande à senestre.	
	Saint-Aubin-des-Ormeaux	D'azur à la fasce ondée d'argent, accompagnée de trois émerillons d'or, becqués, chaperonnés et membrés de gueules.	
	Saint-Avaugourd-des-Landes	D'argent au canard en vol de sinople posé en pal, à la champagne ondée d'azur, au chef de gueules.	
	Saint-Benoist-sur-Mer	D'azur à la croix haussée d'or, enhendée en chef et aux flancs, perronnée d'un degré en pointe, cantonnée au premier d'un buste de Saint Benoît issant de la traverse, au deuxième d'une poignée de quatre trèfles tigés, au troisième d'un lapin contourné assis sur une terrasse isolée fumant la pipe, au quatrième d'un bateau à voile contourné voguant vent debout, le tout d'or.	
	Saint-Christophe-du-Ligneron	Tranché : au premier, de sinople au double cœur vidé, couronné et croiseté d'argent; au second, d'argent à la tierce ondée d'azur en pointe; à Saint Christophe d'argent, vêtu de gueules, issant de la tierce et brochant sur le tout.	
	Saint-Cyr-en-Talmondais	D'argent à l'écusson abaissé soudé d'or chargé d'une tour de sable, ouverte, ajourée et maçonnée du champ, accostée en chef de deux coquilles de gueules, deux bécasses affrontées au naturel marchant sur le haut de l'écusson.	
	Saint-Denis-la-Chevasse	Burelé d'or et de gueules de dix pièces à la bisse d'azur ondoyante en pal brochant sur le tout.	
	Sainte-Cécile	Gironné d'azur et d'or de seize pièces, à la fasce d'argent denchée en pointe, chargée à dextre d'une croisette pattée de gueules et à senestre d'une lyre du même, brochant sur le tout.	
	Sainte-Flaive-des-Loups	De gueules à l'anille d'argent, au chef d'or chargé de trois têtes de loup arrachées de sable.	
	Sainte-Gemme-la-Plaine	D'hermine plain, chaque moucheture soutenue d'un croissant de gueules.	
	Sainte-Hermine	D'hermine plain.	
	Sainte-Radégonde-des-Noyers	D'or au chevron de gueules soutenu d'une corneille éployée de sable.	
	Saint-Étienne-du-Bois	D'azur à la barre d'or, chargée en chef d'un double cœur vidé, couronné et croiseté de gueules posé à plomb, en pointe de deux palmes de sinople passées en sautoir et en abîme de deux lettres S et E capitales aussi de gueules posées à plomb et rangées en fasce, accompagnée en chef d'une grappe de raisin aussi d'or, feuillée aussi de sinople et en pointe de deux feuilles de chêne du même posées en barre et englantées de deux pièces d'or.	
	Saint-Florent-des-Bois	Parti : au premier, d'or aux trois fleurs de lys d'azur mal ordonnées, au franc-canton de gueules; au second, d'azur à la crosse abbatiale d'or accostée à dextre d'une clef d'argent et à senestre d'une fleur de lys aussi d'or.	
	Saint-Fulgent	D'azur semé d'étoiles d'or au lion léopardé du même, armé et lampassé de gueules, brochant sur le tout.	
	Saint-Georges-de-Montaigu	D'azur au pairle d'argent, accosté à dextre d'une roue dentée d'or et à senestre d'un épi de blé feuillé du même, au pont de quatre arches aussi d'or mouvant de la pointe, surmonté d'une crosse de sable, brochant sur le pairle.	
	Saint-Germain-de-Prinçay	De sinople à l'épée haute d'or, accostée de deux chapelles du même, à la bordure componée d'argent et de gueules de seize pièces.	
	Saint-Gilles-Croix-de-Vie	Parti : au premier, d'azur à l'ancre d'or; au second, de gueules semé de fleurs de lys d'or.	
	Saint-Hilaire-de-Loulay	De gueules à la crosse épiscopale d'or, à la mitre d'argent brochant sur le tout, au chef d'hermine chargé de trois tours, donjonnées chacune de trois tourelles d'or, ouvertes, ajourées et maçonnées de sable.	
	Saint-Hilaire-de-Riez	D'azur à la croix partie d'or et de sable.	
	Saint-Hilaire-le-Vouhis	De gueules à la bande cousue de sable, chargée de quatre fusées d'argent posées à plomb, accompagnée en chef de trois tours donjonnées chacune de trois tourelles d'or et en pointe d'un chêne arraché du même.	
	Saint-Jean-de-Monts	D'azur à la fasce d'argent, accompagnée en chef d'un agneau pascal du même, la tête nimbée et contournée, portant une bannerette chargée d'une croisette aussi d'argent à la hampe d'or, et en pointe d'un mont de trois coupeaux du même.	
	Saint-Laurent-sur-Sèvre	D'azur à la croix d'or mouvant d'une plaine ondée de sable, cantonnée au premier d'une fleur de lys d'or, au deuxième d'un gril du même la poignée vers le chef, au troisième d'un sautoir aussi d'or chargé de cinq losanges de gueules posées à plomb, au quatrième de trois étoiles d'or, au double cœur vidé, couronné et croiseté de gueules, brochant en abîme.	
	Saint-Martin-des-Noyers	Taillé : au premier, de sable à l'épée d'argent posée en fasce la pointe vers senestre, supportant un manteau de gueules; au second, d'or aux trois noyers arrachés de sable, feuillés de sinople et fruités d'argent, mal ordonnés.	
	Saint-Martin-des-Tilleuls	Coupé : au premier, parti : au premier d'argent aux trois fasces d'azur et au second de sable à la bande d'argent chargée de quatre fusées du champ accolées et posées en barre; au second, de gueules aux trois croisettes pattées d'argent.	
	Saint-Mathurin	De sinople aux trois bourrines d'or, au chef du même chargé d'une croisette potencée du champ.	
	Saint-Maurice-des-Noues	D'azur aux trois chevrons d'argent.	
	Saint-Maurice-le-Girard	D'azur à la bande d'or chargée de trois croissants soudés d'argent et côtoyée de deux clefs de sable posées en bande.	
	Saint-Mesmin	De sinople au lion d'or, au chef bastillé du même chargé d'un rencontre de bœuf de sable, accosté de deux marrons du même dans leurs bogues de sinople, feuillés du même.	
	Saint-Michel-le-Cloucq	D'azur au donjon couvert d'argent ouvert et ajouré du champ, flanqué de deux tours couvertes aussi d'argent, ajourées du champ, le tout maçonné de sable, soutenu de l'archange Saint Michel d'or, au franc-canton dextre cousu de gueules chargé d'un chêne d'or et au franc-canton senestre aussi cousu de gueules chargé d'une gerbe de blé aussi d'or.	
	Saint-Paul-en-Pareds	Coupé : au premier, de sinople à la roue à aube sur une rivière, accompagnée à dextre d'un moulin à vent et à senestre d'une gerbe de blé, le tout d'argent; au second, de gueules au château de trois tours d'or posé sur une colline de sinople; à la bordure componée de seize pièces de gueules au cœur vendéen d'or et d'azur à la fleur de lys d'or.	
	Saint-Philbert-de-Bouaine	De gueules aux cinq tours donjonnées de trois tourelles d'or, ordonnées en sautoir, à la croix perronnée de trois degrés d'argent brochant sur le tout, au franc-quartier d'hermine.	
	Saint-Pierre-le-Vieux	D'argent à la fasce d'azur.	
	Saint-Prouant	D'argent à la croix gironnée d'or et d'azur de huit pièces, cantonnée au premier et au quatrième d'un double cœur vidé, couronné et croiseté de gueules, au deuxième et au troisième d'une étoile de six rais gironnée d'or et d'azur de douze pièces.	
	Saint-Sulpice-en-Pareds	Taillé : au premier, d'azur au buste de Saint Sulpice d'argent, nimbé d'or, issant d'une nuée aussi d'argent; au second, de gueules au château couvert d'or posé sur une motte alésée de sinople chargée d'une onde d'azur, surmonté d'une fleur de lys d'argent.	
	Saint-Sulpice-le-Verdon	De sinople à la croix haussée alésée fleurdelysée d'or, cantonnée en chef à dextre d'un lion du même, lampassé, armé et couronné de gueules.	
	Saint-Vincent-Sterlanges	De gueules aux trois angelots d'argent.	
	Saint-Vincent-sur-Graon	D'azur à la croix de huit pointes d'or, cantonnée en chef à senestre d'une fleur de lys du même, à la plaine ondée d'argent chargée d'une rose de gueules.	
	Sigournais	D'or au château couvert de sable, girouetté du même, ouvert, ajouré et crénelé d'argent, au chef de vair de deux tires.	
	Soullans	De sinople à la croix écartelée d'or et de sable.	

== T ==
Image	Name of Commune	French original blazon	English blazon
	Talmont-Saint-Hilaire	D'argent aux trois tours crénelées de gueules, couvertes et girouettées du même, ouvertes, ajourées et maçonnées du champ.	
	La Tardière	De gueules à la chapelle d'or, ouverte et ajourée de sable, soutenue à dextre d’une branche de chêne de sinople et à senestre d'une branche de châtaignier du même, les tiges passées en sautoir en pointe et liées d'argent; à la champagne ondée d'azur chargée d'une jumelle ondée d’argent; au chef d'or fretté de sable de dix pièces.	
	Thorigny	De sinople à la tour d'argent, ouverte et ajourée du champ, maçonnée de sable.	
	Tiffauges	D'azur semé de fleurs de lys d'or, au franc-quartier cousu de gueules chargé d'une épée haute d'argent.	
	La Tranche-sur-Mer	De gueules au lion d'or, au chef parti : au premier cousu d'azur au soleil non figuré d'or, et au second cousu de sinople au cœur vendéen d'argent.	
	Treize-Septiers	Parti : au premier, de gueules au setier d'or cerclé de sable; au second, de sinople à la gerbe de blé d'or; le tout sommé d'un chef cousu d'azur chargé de trois tours d'argent, ouvertes du champ et maçonnées de sable.	
	Treize-Vents	Treize vans posés 3, 3, 3, 3 et 1.	

== V ==
Image	Name of Commune	French original blazon	English blazon
	Vairé	De gueules à la châsse d'or, allumée d'argent, surmontée à senestre d'une coquille aussi d'argent brochant sur deux bourdons de pèlerin de sable passés en sautoir, au franc-canton cousu d'azur chargé d'une croisette de huit pointes aussi d'or.	
	Velluire	Écartelé : au premier, d'or au château de gueules, maçonné de sable; au deuxième, de sinople à la traverse ondée d'argent; au troisième, d'azur à la torque versée d'or; au quatrième, d'or à la fasce fuselée de cinq pièces de gueules.	
	La Verrie	D'azur à la crosse d'or, accostée à dextre d'un bœuf effrayé contourné d'argent et à senestre de trois merlettes du même ordonnées 2 et 1.	
