= Arrondissement of Les Sables-d'Olonne =

Coordinates: 46°30′N 1°48′W

Les Sables-d'Olonne
- Arrondissement
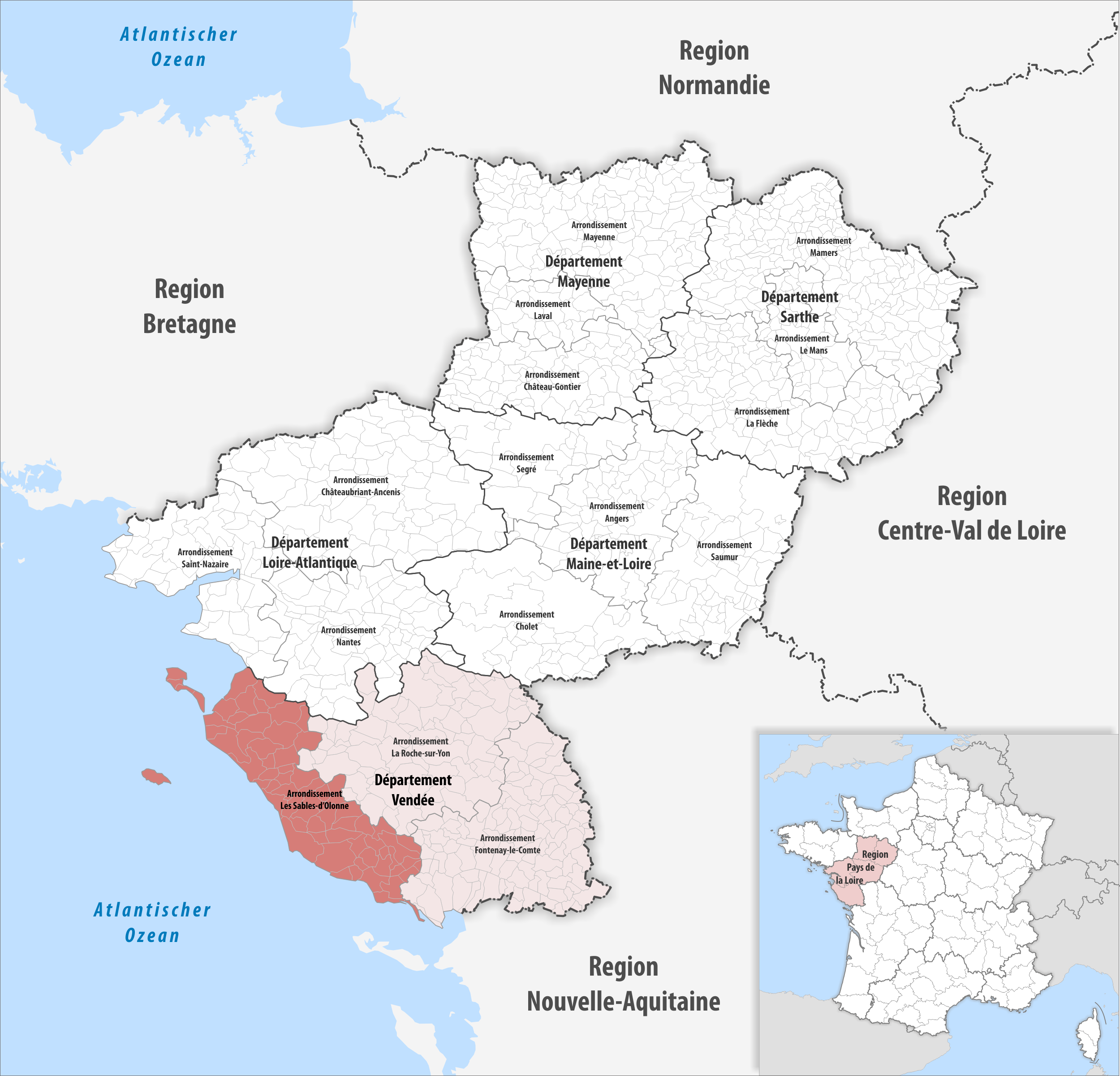
- Location within the region Pays de la Loire
- Country: France
- Region: Pays de la Loire
- Department: Vendée
- No. of communes: {{{nbcomm}}}
- Area: 1,914.7 km^{2} (739.3 sq mi)
- Population (2023): 263,727
  - Density: 137.74/km^{2} (356.74/sq mi)
- INSEE code: 853

The arrondissement of Les Sables-d'Olonne is an arrondissement of France in the Vendée department in the Pays de la Loire region. It has 71 communes. Its population is 255,090 (2021), and its area is 1,914.7 km^{2} (739.3 sq mi).

== Composition ==
The communes of the arrondissement of Les Sables-d'Olonne, and their INSEE codes, are:

1. Les Achards (85152)
2. L'Aiguillon-la-Presqu'île (85001)
3. L'Aiguillon-sur-Vie (85002)
4. Angles (85004)
5. Avrillé (85010)
6. Barbâtre (85011)
7. La Barre-de-Monts (85012)
8. Beaulieu-sous-la-Roche (85016)
9. Beauvoir-sur-Mer (85018)
10. Le Bernard (85022)
11. Bois-de-Céné (85024)
12. La Boissière-des-Landes (85026)
13. Bouin (85029)
14. Brem-sur-Mer (85243)
15. Bretignolles-sur-Mer (85035)
16. La Chaize-Giraud (85045)
17. Challans (85047)
18. Le Champ-Saint-Père (85050)
19. La Chapelle-Hermier (85054)
20. Châteauneuf (85062)
21. Coëx (85070)
22. Commequiers (85071)
23. Curzon (85077)
24. L'Épine (85083)
25. Le Fenouiller (85088)
26. Froidfond (85095)
27. La Garnache (85096)
28. Le Girouard (85099)
29. Givrand (85100)
30. Le Givre (85101)
31. Grosbreuil (85103)
32. La Guérinière (85106)
33. L'Île-d'Olonne (85112)
34. L'Île-d'Yeu (85113)
35. Jard-sur-Mer (85114)
36. La Jonchère (85116)
37. Landevieille (85120)
38. Longeville-sur-Mer (85127)
39. Martinet (85138)
40. Moutiers-les-Mauxfaits (85156)
41. Nieul-le-Dolent (85161)
42. Noirmoutier-en-l'Île (85163)
43. Notre-Dame-de-Monts (85164)
44. Notre-Dame-de-Riez (85189)
45. Le Perrier (85172)
46. Poiroux (85179)
47. Les Sables-d'Olonne (85194)
48. Saint-Avaugourd-des-Landes (85200)
49. Saint-Benoist-sur-Mer (85201)
50. Saint-Christophe-du-Ligneron (85204)
51. Saint-Cyr-en-Talmondais (85206)
52. Sainte-Flaive-des-Loups (85211)
53. Sainte-Foy (85214)
54. Saint-Georges-de-Pointindoux (85218)
55. Saint-Gervais (85221)
56. Saint-Gilles-Croix-de-Vie (85222)
57. Saint-Hilaire-de-Riez (85226)
58. Saint-Hilaire-la-Forêt (85231)
59. Saint-Jean-de-Monts (85234)
60. Saint-Julien-des-Landes (85236)
61. Saint-Maixent-sur-Vie (85239)
62. Saint-Mathurin (85250)
63. Saint-Révérend (85268)
64. Saint-Urbain (85273)
65. Saint-Vincent-sur-Graon (85277)
66. Saint-Vincent-sur-Jard (85278)
67. Sallertaine (85280)
68. Soullans (85284)
69. Talmont-Saint-Hilaire (85288)
70. La Tranche-sur-Mer (85294)
71. Vairé (85298)

== History ==
The arrondissement of Les Sables-d'Olonne was created in 1800. At the January 2017 reorganisation of the arrondissements of Vendée, it lost eight communes to the arrondissement of La Roche-sur-Yon. In January 2019 the commune Landeronde passed from the arrondissement of Les Sables-d'Olonne to the arrondissement of La Roche-sur-Yon.

As a result of the reorganisation of the cantons of France which came into effect in 2015, the borders of the cantons are no longer related to the borders of the arrondissements. The cantons of the arrondissement of Les Sables-d'Olonne were, as of January 2015:

1. Beauvoir-sur-Mer
2. Challans
3. L'Île-d'Yeu
4. La Mothe-Achard
5. Moutiers-les-Mauxfaits
6. Noirmoutier-en-l'Île
7. Palluau
8. Les Sables-d'Olonne
9. Saint-Gilles-Croix-de-Vie
10. Saint-Jean-de-Monts
11. Talmont-Saint-Hilaire
