= Angles, Vendée =

Angles
- Commune
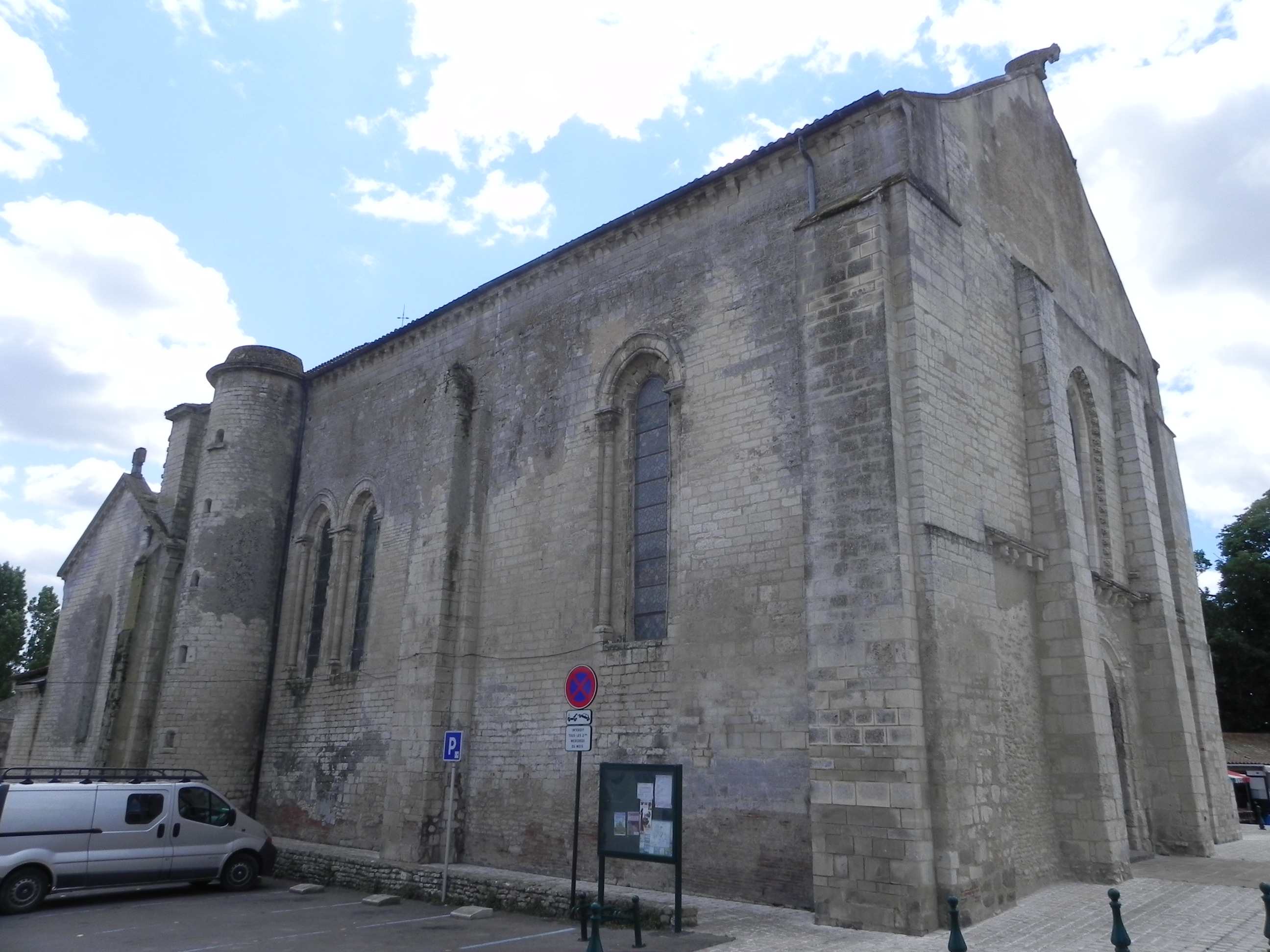
- The church of Our Lady of the Angels, in Angles

- Coat of arms
- Location of Angles
- Location within France Location within Pays de la Loire
- Coordinates: 46°24′26″N 1°24′22″W
- Country: France
- Region: Pays de la Loire
- Department: Vendée
- Arrondissement: Les Sables-d'Olonne
- Canton: Mareuil-sur-Lay-Dissais
- Intercommunality: Vendée Grand Littoral

Government
  - Mayor (2020–2026): Joël Monvoisin
- Area^{1}: 34.27 km^{2} (13.23 sq mi)
- Elevation: 9 m (30 ft)
- Highest elevation: 22 m (72 ft)
- Lowest elevation: 1 m (3.3 ft)
- Population (2023): 3,115
  - Density: 90.90/km^{2} (235.4/sq mi)
- Time zone: UTC+01:00 (CET)
  - Summer (DST): UTC+02:00 (CEST)
- INSEE/Postal code: 85004 /85750
- ^{1} French Land Register data, which excludes lakes, ponds, glaciers > 1 km^{2} (0.386 sq mi or 247 acres) and river estuaries.

Angles (French pronunciation: [ɑ̃ɡl]) is a commune in the Vendée department in the Pays de la Loire region in western France.

== Geography ==
The river Lay forms all of the commune's eastern border. Angles is located to the south of the department between plains and marshes, 7 kilometres from the beaches of La Tranche sur Mer and Longeville sur Mer. The town is noted for its old alleys and its Romanesque and Gothic church.

=== Climate ===
Angles has an oceanic climate (Köppen climate classification Cfb). The average annual temperature in Angles is 13.2 °C (55.8 °F). The average annual rainfall is 869.3 mm (34.22 in) with November as the wettest month. The temperatures are highest on average in July, at around 20.5 °C (68.9 °F), and lowest in January, at around 6.6 °C (43.9 °F). The highest temperature ever recorded in Angles was 41.0 °C (105.8 °F) on 7 August 2003; the coldest temperature ever recorded was −14.0 °C (6.8 °F) on 14 January 1987.

Climate data for Angles (1991−2020 normals, extremes 1978−2020)
Month	Jan	Feb	Mar	Apr	May	Jun	Jul	Aug	Sep	Oct	Nov	Dec	Year
Record high °C (°F)	16.5 (61.7)	21.5 (70.7)	27.0 (80.6)	29.0 (84.2)	33.5 (92.3)	39.0 (102.2)	38.6 (101.5)	41.0 (105.8)	35.0 (95.0)	31.2 (88.2)	22.0 (71.6)	17.0 (62.6)	41.0 (105.8)
Mean daily maximum °C (°F)	10.0 (50.0)	11.2 (52.2)	14.5 (58.1)	17.4 (63.3)	20.9 (69.6)	24.5 (76.1)	26.7 (80.1)	26.8 (80.2)	23.7 (74.7)	18.9 (66.0)	13.8 (56.8)	10.5 (50.9)	18.2 (64.8)
Daily mean °C (°F)	6.6 (43.9)	6.9 (44.4)	9.5 (49.1)	11.8 (53.2)	15.4 (59.7)	18.7 (65.7)	20.5 (68.9)	20.5 (68.9)	17.7 (63.9)	14.2 (57.6)	9.8 (49.6)	7.0 (44.6)	13.2 (55.8)
Mean daily minimum °C (°F)	3.2 (37.8)	2.7 (36.9)	4.5 (40.1)	6.2 (43.2)	9.8 (49.6)	12.8 (55.0)	14.4 (57.9)	14.2 (57.6)	11.6 (52.9)	9.4 (48.9)	5.7 (42.3)	3.5 (38.3)	8.2 (46.8)
Record low °C (°F)	−14.0 (6.8)	−10.5 (13.1)	−10.5 (13.1)	−4.8 (23.4)	0.0 (32.0)	5.0 (41.0)	7.0 (44.6)	6.0 (42.8)	3.0 (37.4)	−2.4 (27.7)	−6.5 (20.3)	−9.5 (14.9)	−14.0 (6.8)
Average precipitation mm (inches)	89.6 (3.53)	70.5 (2.78)	63.1 (2.48)	62.5 (2.46)	53.3 (2.10)	44.0 (1.73)	46.9 (1.85)	49.1 (1.93)	68.4 (2.69)	101.8 (4.01)	112.6 (4.43)	107.5 (4.23)	869.3 (34.22)
Average precipitation days (≥ 1.0 mm)	13.9	11.8	10.6	10.1	9.0	7.2	7.0	7.0	8.1	12.4	14.0	15.1	126.2
Source: Météo-France

== History ==
Georges Clemenceau, a resident of the nearby Saint-Vincent-sur-Jard, described Angles at the beginning of the century as "a small town located at the extreme edge of the grove at the exact point where the sea retreats from the vast plain of Vendeen green marsh and where livestock is the country's industry. The agricultural vocation has long been the economic engine of an entire region, but since the early writings of the Tigris, much has changed ...

In the early eleventh century the area was subject to numerous Norman invasions, a concern that led to a significant depopulation during this period. However, the Tower of Moricq was constructed by local lords such as the Prince of Talmont in 1040 to safeguard the security of the area. They aimed to attract people to the area, especially the barons by providing real estate and financial resources to the development of agricultural activity and a church. In this context the city had its foundation around 1075 with the establishment, on the ruins of an ancient Gallo-Roman church of Sancta Maria Anglis (St. Mary of the Angels) by William son of Herbert.

Tourism is a contributor to what is otherwise an agricultural economy and in the summer months tourists stay in Angles in campsites and cottages in the area.

== Population ==
Historical population
Year	Pop.	±% p.a.
1968	923	—
1975	964	+0.62%
1982	1,153	+2.59%
1990	1,314	+1.65%
1999	1,582	+2.08%
2007	2,095	+3.57%
2012	2,574	+4.20%
2017	2,816	+1.81%
2023	3,115	+1.70%
Source: INSEE

== Personalities ==
- René-Antoine Ferchault de Réaumur
- Raoul Pacaud (1862–1932), Deputy of the Vendée (1914–1919, 1928–1932)
- Albert Deman (1927–1996)

== See also ==
- Communes of the Vendée department
