= Les Sables d'Olonne Agglomération =

- Communauté d'agglomération
- Interactive map of Les Sables d'Olonne Agglomération
- Coordinates: 46°33′N 01°45′W
- Country: France
- Region: Pays de la Loire
- Department: Vendée
- No. of communes: {{{nbcomm}}}
- Established: 2017
- Area: 172.1 km^{2} (66.4 sq mi)
- Population (2019): 54,258
  - Density: 315.3/km^{2} (816.5/sq mi)
- Website: www.lsoagglo.fr

Les Sables d'Olonne Agglomération is the communauté d'agglomération, an intercommunal structure, centred on the city of Les Sables-d'Olonne.

== Geography ==
It is located in the Vendée department, in the Pays de la Loire region, western France. Created in 2017, its seat is in Les Sables-d'Olonne. Its area is 172.1 km^{2}.

== Demographics ==
Its population was 54,258 in 2019, of which 45,030 in Les Sables-d'Olonne proper.

== Composition ==
The communauté d'agglomération consists of the following 5 communes:

1. L'Île-d'Olonne
2. Les Sables-d'Olonne
3. Sainte-Foy
4. Saint-Mathurin
5. Vairé
