= Longeville-sur-Mer =

- Commune
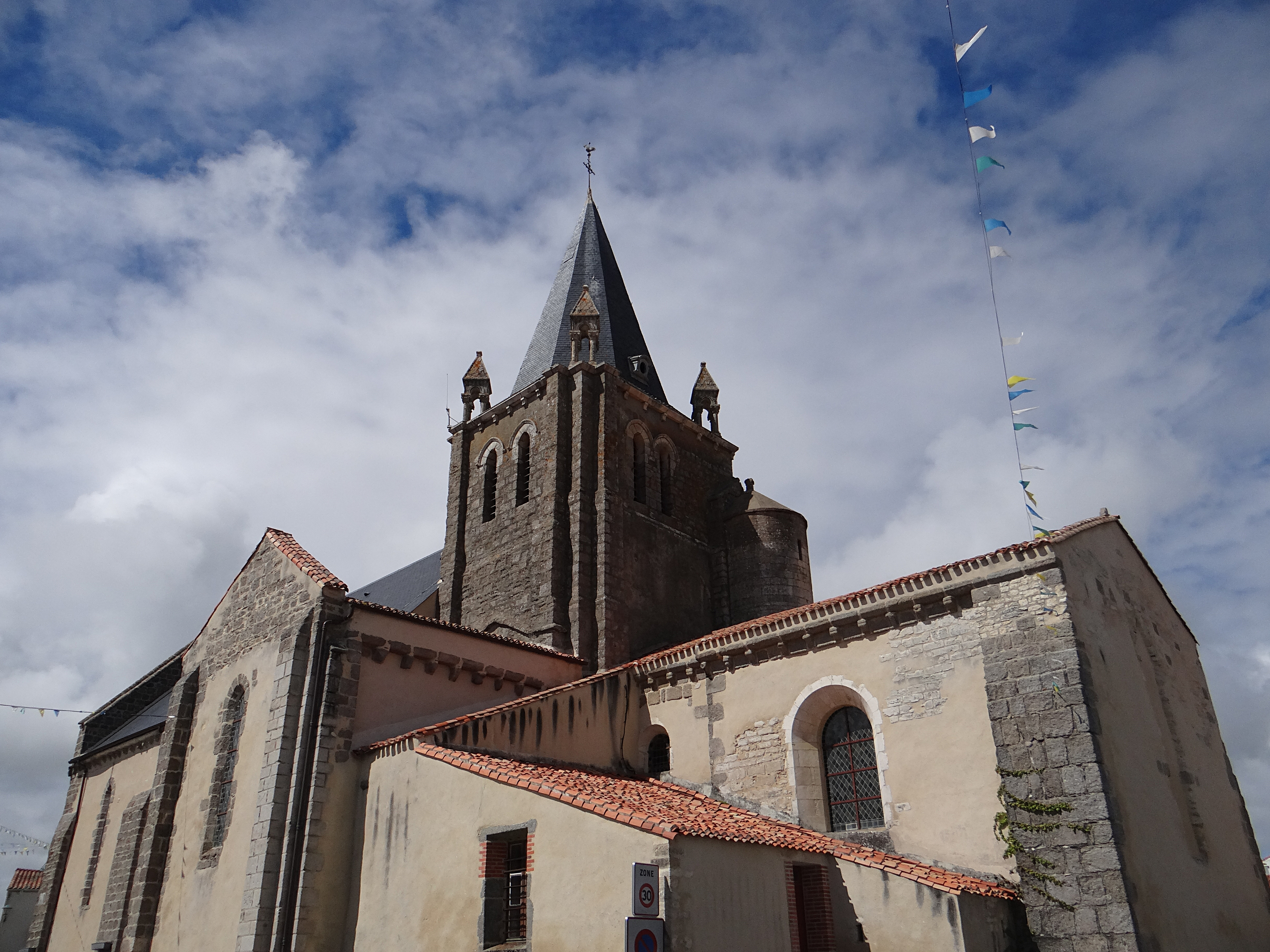
- The church of Our Lady of the Assumption

- Coat of arms
- Location of Longeville-sur-Mer
- Location within France Location within Pays de la Loire
- Coordinates: 46°25′31″N 1°29′18″W
- Country: France
- Region: Pays de la Loire
- Department: Vendée
- Arrondissement: Les Sables-d'Olonne
- Canton: Talmont-Saint-Hilaire

Government
  - Mayor (2020–2026): Annick Pasquereau
- Area^{1}: 38.05 km^{2} (14.69 sq mi)
- Elevation: 20 m (66 ft)
- Highest elevation: 30 m (98 ft)
- Lowest elevation: 0 m (0 ft)
- Population (2023): 2,625
  - Density: 68.99/km^{2} (178.7/sq mi)
- Time zone: UTC+01:00 (CET)
  - Summer (DST): UTC+02:00 (CEST)
- INSEE/Postal code: 85127 /85560
- ^{1} French Land Register data, which excludes lakes, ponds, glaciers > 1 km^{2} (0.386 sq mi or 247 acres) and river estuaries.

Longeville-sur-Mer (French pronunciation: [lɔ̃ʒvil syʁ mɛʁ], literally Longeville on Sea) is a commune in the Vendée department in the Pays de la Loire region in western France.

== Geography ==
North of the Marais Poitevin, Longeville-sur-Mer is situated in the south of the Vendée department, along the Côte de Lumière (English: Coast of Light). The commune gives its name to a coastal forest of pines and oaks. The town's central village lies one kilometre inland, but the municipality itself comprises three smaller seaside resorts, these beings the hamlets of 'Le Bouil', 'Le Rocher' and 'Les Conches'. A celebrated surf spot, named Bud Bud, is found at Les Conches, whilst the road leading from the beach to the nearby town of Angles passes through a marsh, from which one may observe wild birds, including storks.

== Population ==
Historical population
Year	Pop.	±% p.a.
1968	1,700	—
1975	1,791	+0.75%
1982	1,876	+0.66%
1990	1,979	+0.67%
1999	1,962	−0.10%
2007	2,300	+2.01%
2012	2,449	+1.26%
2017	2,466	+0.14%
2023	2,625	+1.05%
Source: INSEE

== See also ==
- Communes of the Vendée department
