= Poiroux =

- Commune
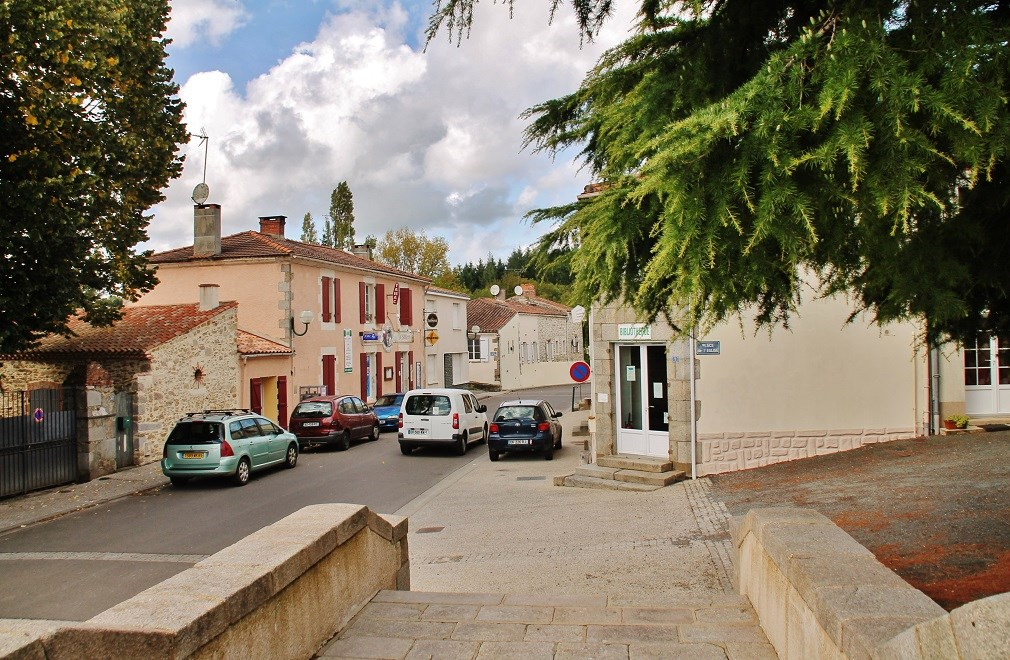
- The center of Poiroux
- Location of Poiroux
- Location within France Location within Pays de la Loire
- Coordinates: 46°30′20″N 1°32′01″W
- Country: France
- Region: Pays de la Loire
- Department: Vendée
- Arrondissement: Les Sables-d'Olonne
- Canton: Talmont-Saint-Hilaire

Government
  - Mayor (2024–2026): Annie Renouf
- Area^{1}: 25.38 km^{2} (9.80 sq mi)
- Elevation: 46 m (151 ft)
- Highest elevation: 74 m (243 ft)
- Lowest elevation: 19 m (62 ft)
- Population (2023): 1,246
  - Density: 49.09/km^{2} (127.2/sq mi)
- Time zone: UTC+01:00 (CET)
  - Summer (DST): UTC+02:00 (CEST)
- INSEE/Postal code: 85179 /85440
- ^{1} French Land Register data, which excludes lakes, ponds, glaciers > 1 km^{2} (0.386 sq mi or 247 acres) and river estuaries.

Poiroux (French pronunciation: [pwaʁu]) is a commune in the Vendée department in the Pays de la Loire region in western France.

== See also ==
- Communes of the Vendée department
