= Nieul-le-Dolent =

- Commune
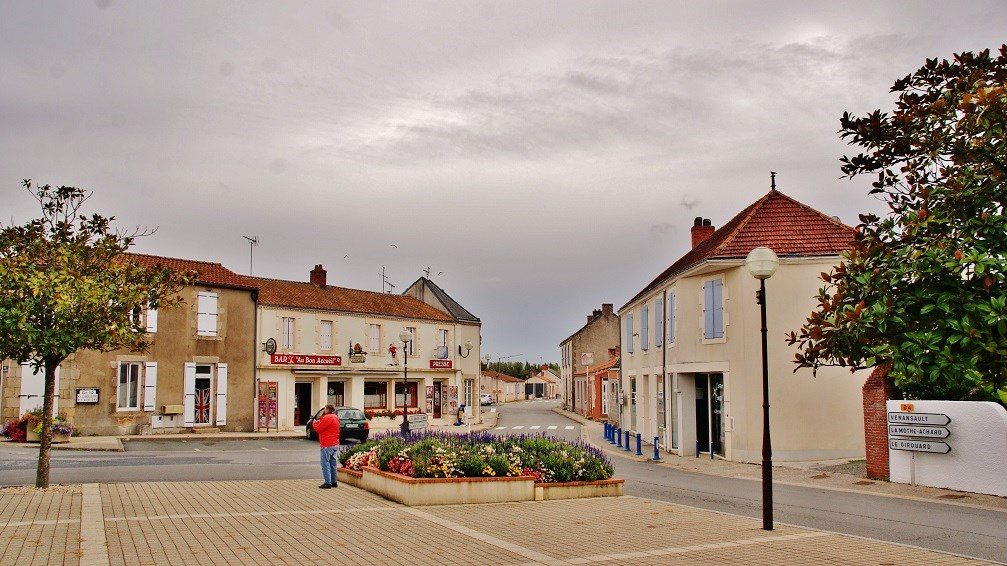

- Coat of arms
- Location of Nieul-le-Dolent
- Location within France Location within Pays de la Loire
- Coordinates: 46°34′33″N 1°30′28″W
- Country: France
- Region: Pays de la Loire
- Department: Vendée
- Arrondissement: Les Sables-d'Olonne
- Canton: Talmont-Saint-Hilaire
- Intercommunality: CC du Pays des Achards

Government
  - Mayor (2020–2026): Dominique Durand
- Area^{1}: 27.50 km^{2} (10.62 sq mi)
- Elevation: 60 m (200 ft)
- Highest elevation: 81 m (266 ft)
- Lowest elevation: 34 m (112 ft)
- Population (2023): 2,571
  - Density: 93.49/km^{2} (242.1/sq mi)
- Time zone: UTC+01:00 (CET)
  - Summer (DST): UTC+02:00 (CEST)
- INSEE/Postal code: 85161 /85430
- ^{1} French Land Register data, which excludes lakes, ponds, glaciers > 1 km^{2} (0.386 sq mi or 247 acres) and river estuaries.

Nieul-le-Dolent (French pronunciation: [njœl lə dɔlɑ̃]) is a commune in the Vendée department in the Pays de la Loire region in western France.

== Population ==
Historical population
Year	Pop.	±% p.a.
1968	1,278	—
1975	1,391	+1.22%
1982	1,601	+2.03%
1990	1,714	+0.86%
1999	1,855	+0.88%
2007	2,160	+1.92%
2012	2,363	+1.81%
2017	2,487	+1.03%
2023	2,571	+0.56%
Source: INSEE

== See also ==
- Communes of the Vendée department
