= Vairé =

- Commune
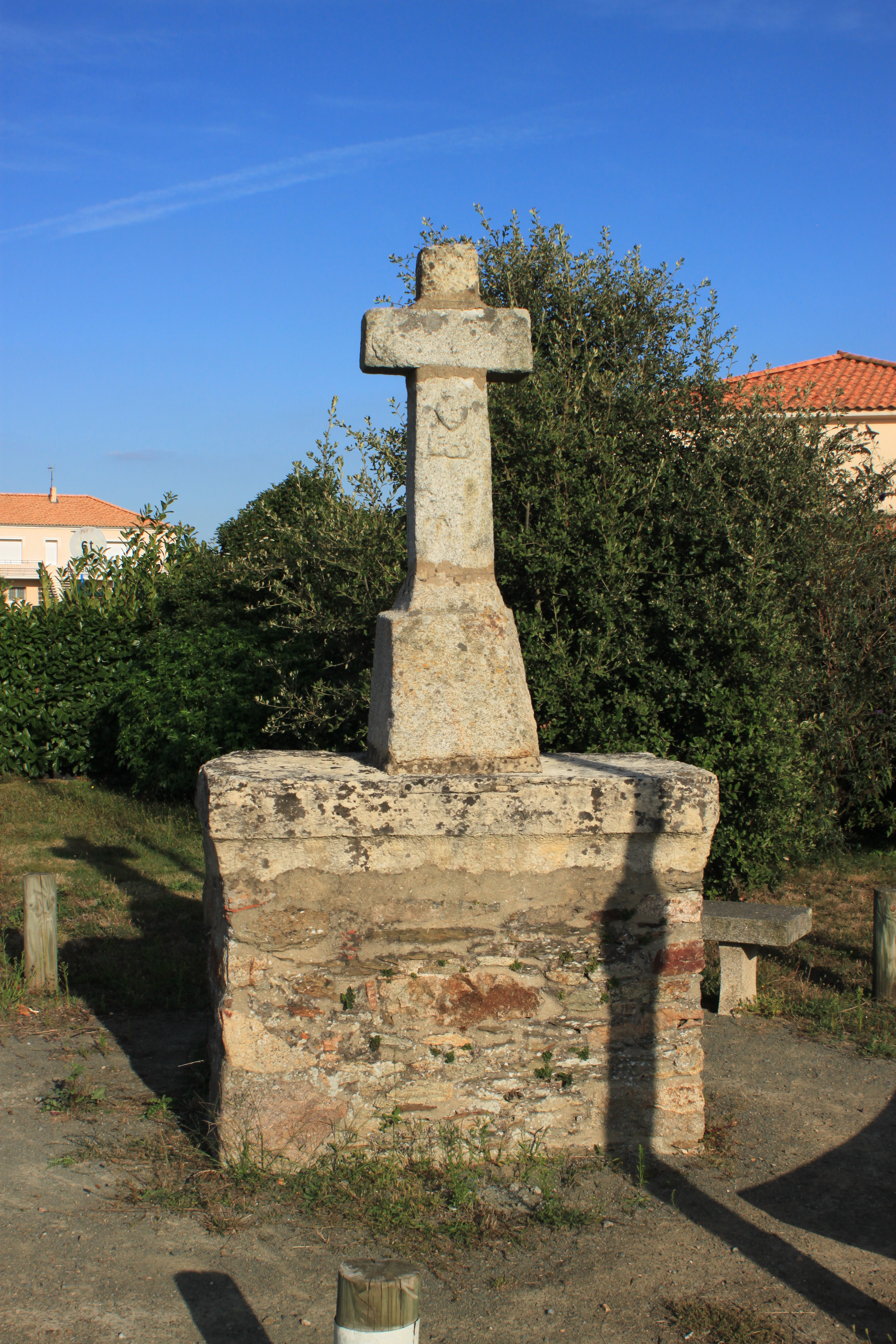
- The cross in Vairé

- Coat of arms
- Location of Vairé
- Location within France Location within Pays de la Loire
- Coordinates: 46°36′09″N 1°45′17″W
- Country: France
- Region: Pays de la Loire
- Department: Vendée
- Arrondissement: Les Sables-d'Olonne
- Canton: Talmont-Saint-Hilaire
- Intercommunality: Les Sables d'Olonne Agglomération

Government
  - Mayor (2020–2026): Michel Chailloux
- Area^{1}: 28.12 km^{2} (10.86 sq mi)
- Highest elevation: 71 m (233 ft)
- Lowest elevation: 0 m (0 ft)
- Population (2023): 1,960
  - Density: 69.7/km^{2} (181/sq mi)
- Time zone: UTC+01:00 (CET)
  - Summer (DST): UTC+02:00 (CEST)
- INSEE/Postal code: 85298 /85150
- ^{1} French Land Register data, which excludes lakes, ponds, glaciers > 1 km^{2} (0.386 sq mi or 247 acres) and river estuaries.

Vairé (French pronunciation: [vɛʁe]) is a commune in the Vendée department in the Pays de la Loire region in western France.

== See also ==
- Communes of the Vendée department
