= Canton of Talmont-Saint-Hilaire =

Administrative division of France

Coordinates: 46.47°N 1.62°W

The canton of Talmont-Saint-Hilaire is an administrative division of the Vendée department, western France. Its borders were modified at the French canton reorganisation which came into effect in March 2015. Its seat is in Talmont-Saint-Hilaire.

It consists of the following communes:

1. Les Achards
2. Avrillé
3. Beaulieu-sous-la-Roche
4. Le Bernard
5. La Chapelle-Hermier
6. Le Girouard
7. Grosbreuil
8. L'Île-d'Olonne
9. Jard-sur-Mer
10. Longeville-sur-Mer
11. Martinet
12. Nieul-le-Dolent
13. Poiroux
14. Sainte-Flaive-des-Loups
15. Sainte-Foy
16. Saint-Georges-de-Pointindoux
17. Saint-Hilaire-la-Forêt
18. Saint-Julien-des-Landes
19. Saint-Mathurin
20. Saint-Vincent-sur-Jard
21. Talmont-Saint-Hilaire
22. Vairé
