= Le Girouard =

- Commune
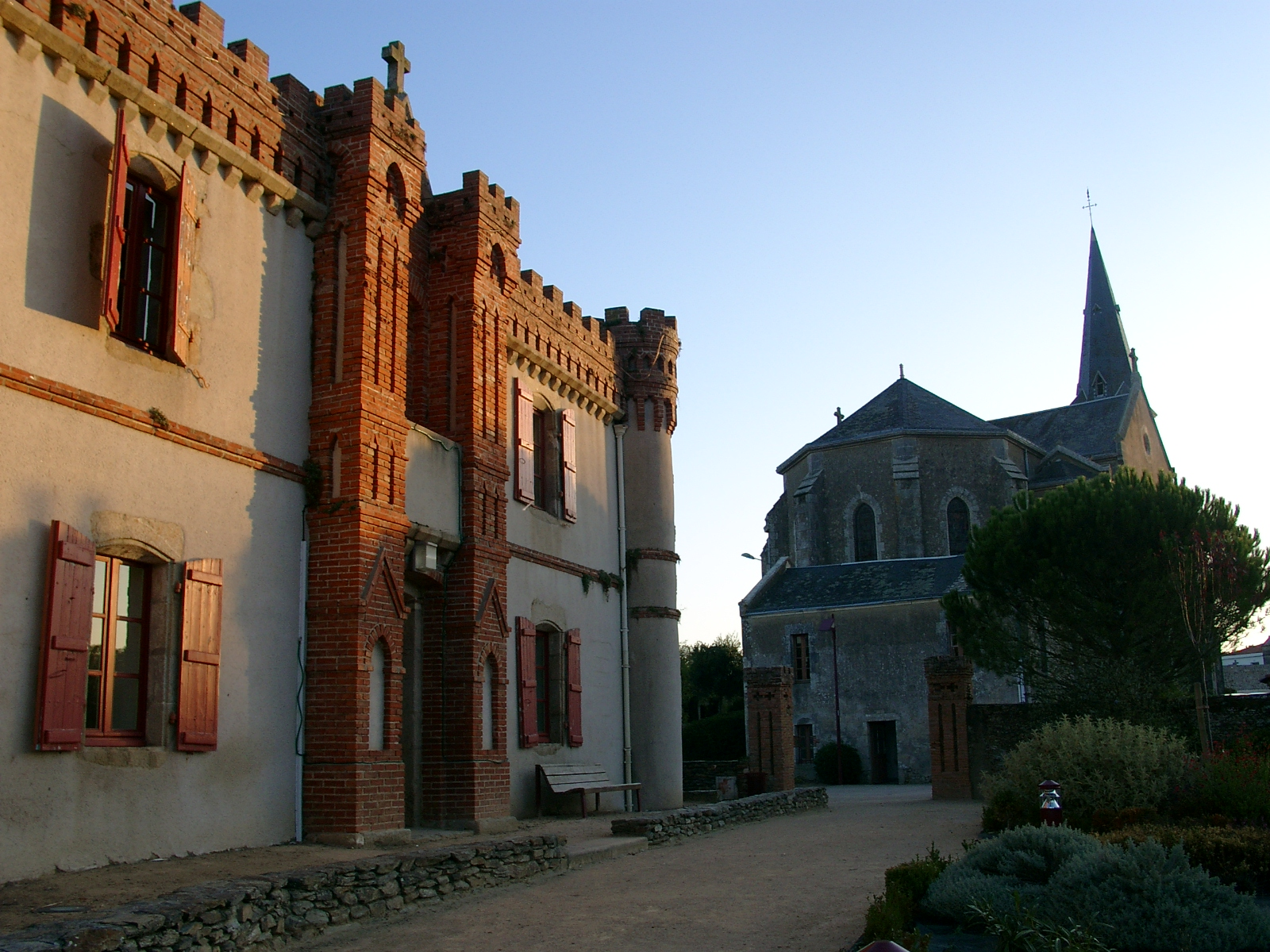
- The church and the Château Gaillard, in the village
- Location of Le Girouard
- Location within France Location within Pays de la Loire
- Coordinates: 46°34′08″N 1°35′54″W
- Country: France
- Region: Pays de la Loire
- Department: Vendée
- Arrondissement: Les Sables-d'Olonne
- Canton: Talmont-Saint-Hilaire
- Intercommunality: Pays des Achards

Government
  - Mayor (2024–2026): Olivier Grit
- Area^{1}: 25.10 km^{2} (9.69 sq mi)
- Highest elevation: 72 m (236 ft)
- Lowest elevation: 14 m (46 ft)
- Population (2023): 1,156
  - Density: 46.06/km^{2} (119.3/sq mi)
- Time zone: UTC+01:00 (CET)
  - Summer (DST): UTC+02:00 (CEST)
- INSEE/Postal code: 85099 /85150
- ^{1} French Land Register data, which excludes lakes, ponds, glaciers > 1 km^{2} (0.386 sq mi or 247 acres) and river estuaries.

Le Girouard (French pronunciation: [lə ʒiʁwaʁ]) is a commune in the Vendée department in the Pays de la Loire region in western France.

== Demography ==
Historical population
| Year | Pop. | ±% p.a. |
|---|---|---|
| 1968 | 749 | — |
| 1975 | 616 | −2.75% |
| 1982 | 489 | −3.24% |
| 1990 | 466 | −0.60% |
| 1999 | 533 | +1.50% |
| 2007 | 761 | +4.55% |
| 2012 | 951 | +4.56% |
| 2017 | 1,050 | +2.00% |
| 2023 | 1,156 | +1.62% |
Source: INSEE

== See also ==
- Communes of the Vendée department
