= Martinet, Vendée =

Martinet
- Commune
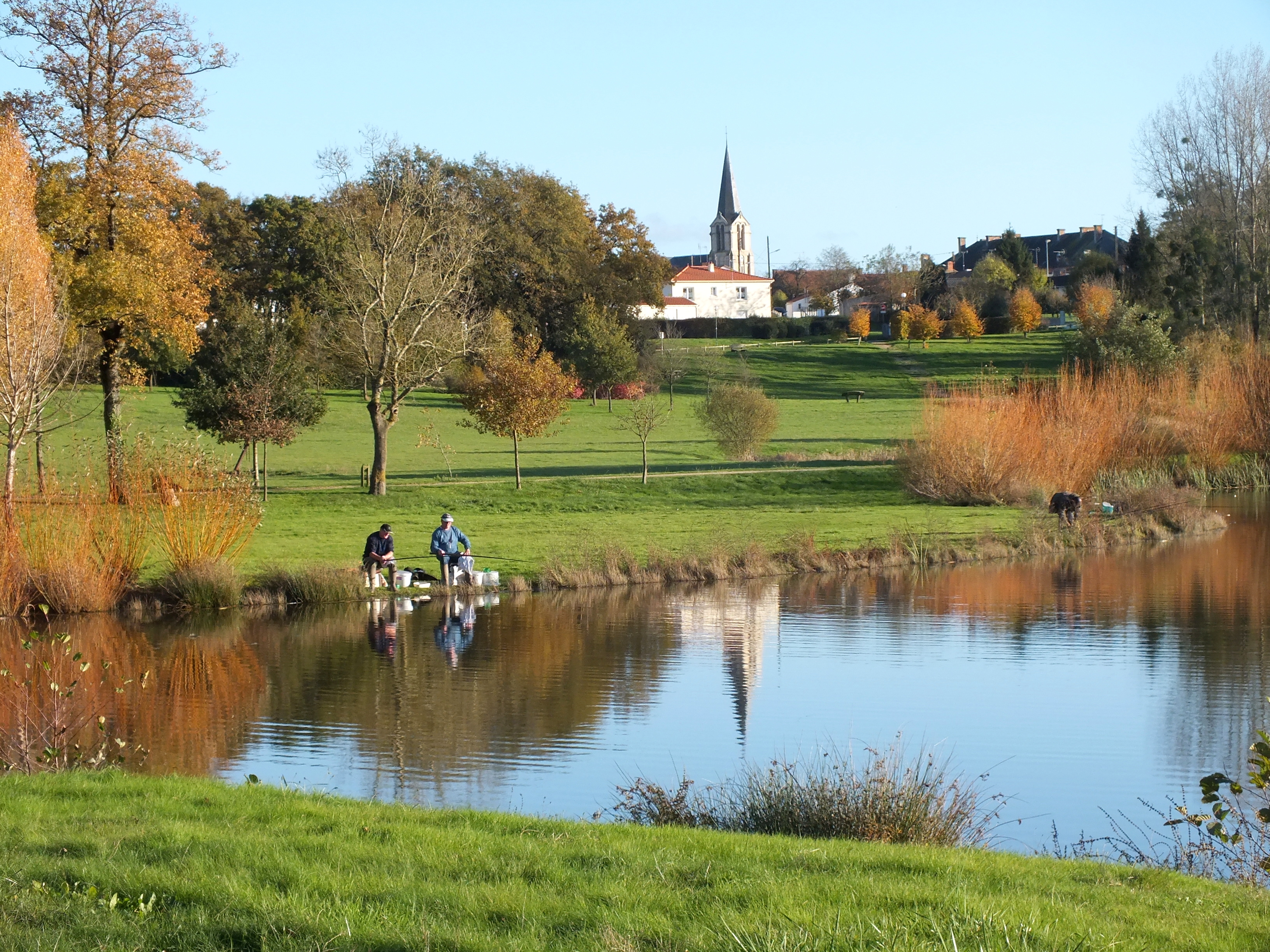
- The Ouches Park and the church, in Martinet

- Coat of arms
- Location of Martinet
- Location within France Location within Pays de la Loire
- Coordinates: 46°40′39″N 1°40′41″W
- Country: France
- Region: Pays de la Loire
- Department: Vendée
- Arrondissement: Les Sables-d'Olonne
- Canton: Talmont-Saint-Hilaire
- Intercommunality: Pays des Achards

Government
  - Mayor (2020–2026): Michel Paillusson
- Area^{1}: 18.11 km^{2} (6.99 sq mi)
- Highest elevation: 63 m (207 ft)
- Lowest elevation: 12 m (39 ft)
- Population (2023): 1,229
  - Density: 67.86/km^{2} (175.8/sq mi)
- Time zone: UTC+01:00 (CET)
  - Summer (DST): UTC+02:00 (CEST)
- INSEE/Postal code: 85138 /85150
- ^{1} French Land Register data, which excludes lakes, ponds, glaciers > 1 km^{2} (0.386 sq mi or 247 acres) and river estuaries.

Martinet (French pronunciation: [maʁtinɛ]) is a commune in the Vendée department in the Pays de la Loire region in western France.

== Geography ==
The municipal territory of Martinet covers 1,840 hectares. The average altitude of the municipality is 42 meters, with levels fluctuating between 12 and 63 meters. It is located on the plateau of the south of the Armorican Massif, in the Bas-Bocage Vendéen, behind the coast, about twenty-five kilometers from Les Sables-d'Olonne and Saint-Gilles-Croix-de-Vie. This plateau rises to 51 meters near Bel-Air. The commune is bordered to the north by the Jaunay which winds through a valley sometimes hollow and bordered by picturesque hillsides. The streams of Malvergne, Guy des Noues and Garangeoire have formed other small valleys that join the Jaunay. On the other hand, in the south of the commune, the flow of water is through the Montmarin stream in the direction of Auzance. The landscape of Martinet is very bocage. The consolidation has not affected it in any way and many wooded areas, as well as old paths little retouched, have preserved a green space and an endearing nature.

== History ==
A prehistoric habitat must have existed on this territory. Numerous discoveries of Neolithic axes have been made in the Aigrefeuilles and Maison Neuve sectors, in the southern part of the town which is also occupied by a vast area which has remained wooded, the Bois-Neuf.

The story of Martinet is that of the humble. There are no major events. Before the Revolution, the small seigniories simply lived off the incessant labor of the men of the land. In 1788, people complained about not being able to cross the Jaunay at the ford of Garreau, too often made impassable by the floods, and people demanded a bridge and a road. In 1789, however, the town had many rural craftsmen linked to agricultural trades.

During the Revolution and the Vendée Wars, Martinet did not remain outdone. In 1793, his men accompanied those of Jean-Baptiste Joly who set out from La Chapelle-Hermier and brought together hundreds of others from the surrounding towns. They participate in the two failed attacks of the Republican pole of Sables-d'Olonne. Then they accompanied him more or less regularly in his various military campaigns on the territory of the Vendée, under the leadership of their first mayor and parish captain Jacques Martin. This one is also taken in the village of Petit-Bois, when he came to buy tobacco. He will be interrogated and shot on 28 February 1794 at La Mothe-Achard.

Under the Empire, Martinet is the place where hides a group of refractory to the conscription of Napoleon, come from the neighboring communes. A fight between them and the gendarmes took place near La Florencière on 4 March 1814, which left three dead among the deserters and two among the gendarmes.

During the 19th century, agriculture improved. Vast areas of moors are put into operation and reveal several new farms. The town is getting organized and progressing little by little. More than twenty-five people die in World War I.

== See also ==
- Communes of the Vendée department
