= L'Île-d'Olonne =

- Commune
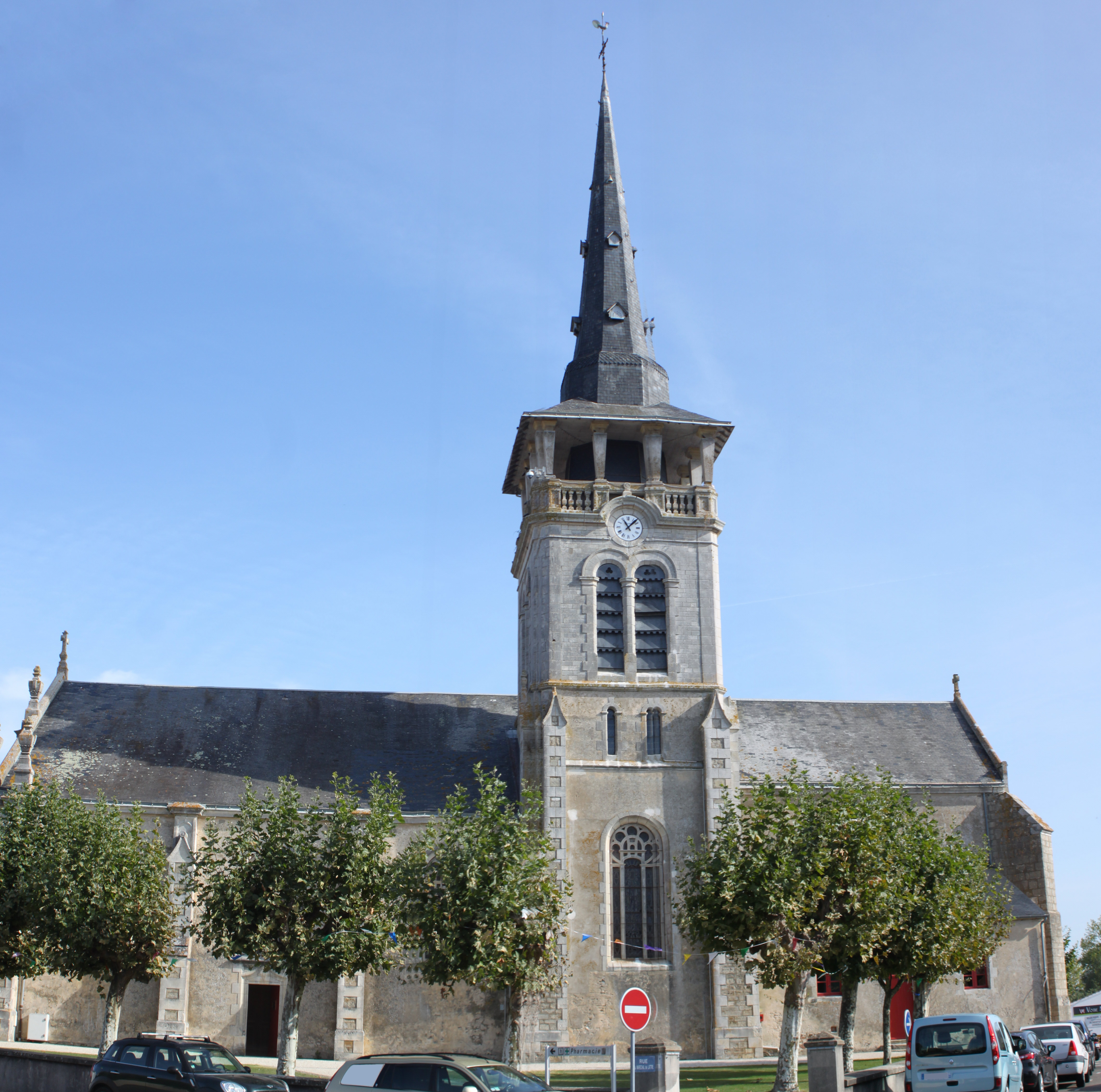
- The church of Saint-Martin-de-Vertou

- Flag Coat of arms
- Location of L'Île-d'Olonne
- Location within France Location within Pays de la Loire
- Coordinates: 46°33′45″N 1°46′51″W
- Country: France
- Region: Pays de la Loire
- Department: Vendée
- Arrondissement: Les Sables-d'Olonne
- Canton: Talmont-Saint-Hilaire
- Intercommunality: Les Sables d'Olonne Agglomération

Government
  - Mayor (2020–2026): Fabrice Chabot
- Area^{1}: 19.23 km^{2} (7.42 sq mi)
- Highest elevation: 32 m (105 ft)
- Lowest elevation: 0 m (0 ft)
- Population (2023): 2,802
  - Density: 145.7/km^{2} (377.4/sq mi)
- Time zone: UTC+01:00 (CET)
  - Summer (DST): UTC+02:00 (CEST)
- INSEE/Postal code: 85112 /85340
- ^{1} French Land Register data, which excludes lakes, ponds, glaciers > 1 km^{2} (0.386 sq mi or 247 acres) and river estuaries.

L'Île-d'Olonne (French pronunciation: [lil dɔlɔn]) is a commune in the Vendée département in the Pays de la Loire region in western France.

== Population ==
Historical population
Year	Pop.	±% p.a.
1968	837	—
1975	934	+1.58%
1982	1,167	+3.23%
1990	1,457	+2.81%
1999	1,820	+2.50%
2007	2,579	+4.45%
2012	2,804	+1.69%
2017	2,694	−0.80%
2023	2,802	+0.66%
Source: INSEE

== See also ==
- Communes of the Vendée department
