= Sainte-Flaive-des-Loups =

- Commune
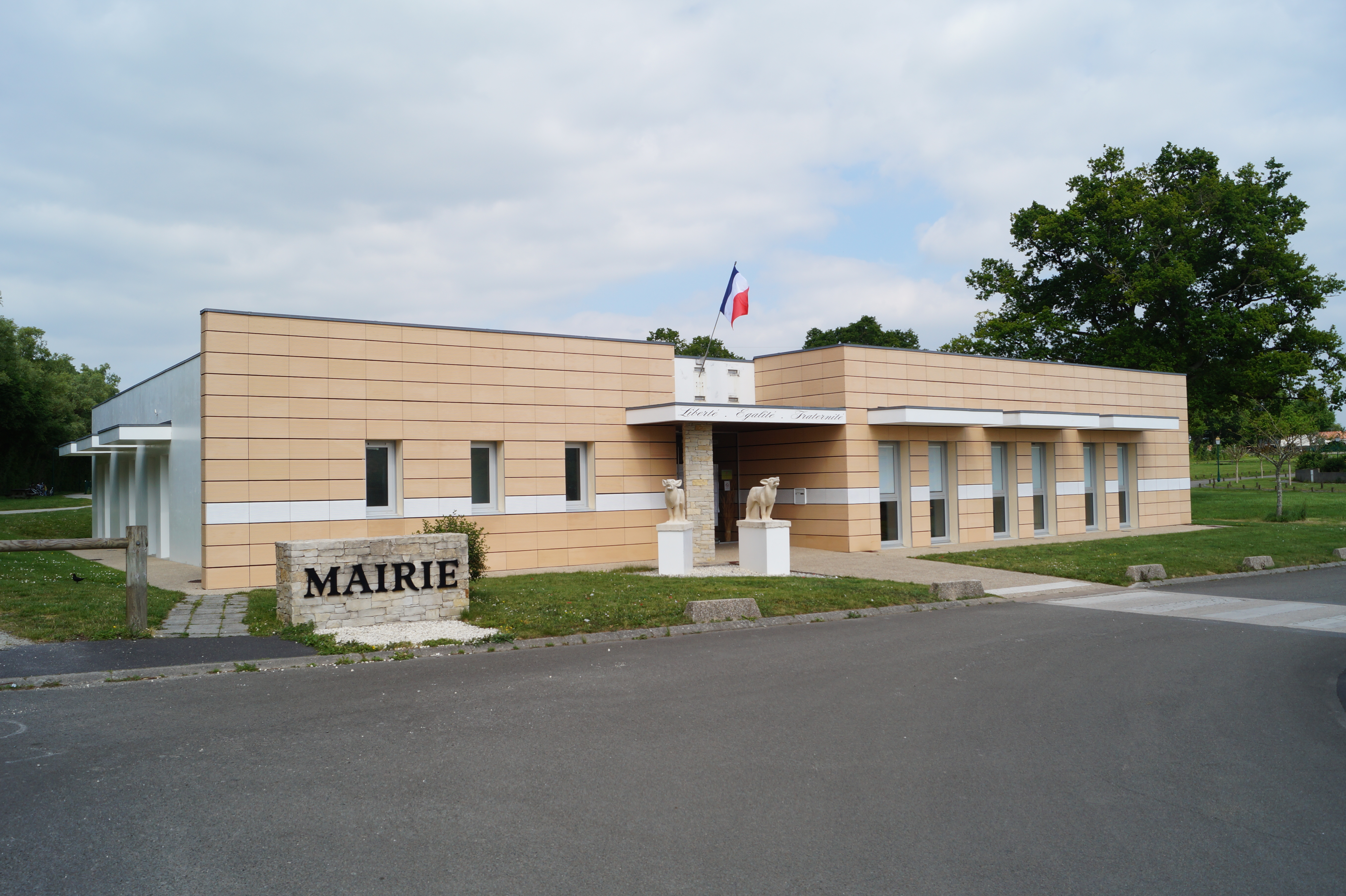
- Town hall

- Coat of arms
- Location of Sainte-Flaive-des-Loups
- Location within France Location within Pays de la Loire
- Coordinates: 46°36′46″N 1°34′43″W
- Country: France
- Region: Pays de la Loire
- Department: Vendée
- Arrondissement: Les Sables-d'Olonne
- Canton: Talmont-Saint-Hilaire
- Intercommunality: Pays des Achards

Government
  - Mayor (2020–2026): Patrice Pageaud
- Area^{1}: 36.11 km^{2} (13.94 sq mi)
- Highest elevation: 77 m (253 ft)
- Lowest elevation: 14 m (46 ft)
- Population (2023): 2,585
  - Density: 71.59/km^{2} (185.4/sq mi)
- Time zone: UTC+01:00 (CET)
  - Summer (DST): UTC+02:00 (CEST)
- INSEE/Postal code: 85211 /85150
- ^{1} French Land Register data, which excludes lakes, ponds, glaciers > 1 km^{2} (0.386 sq mi or 247 acres) and river estuaries.

Sainte-Flaive-des-Loups (French pronunciation: [sɛ̃t flɛv de lu]) is a commune in the Vendée department in the Pays de la Loire region in western France.

== Population ==
Historical population
Year	Pop.	±% p.a.
1968	1,213	—
1975	1,145	−0.82%
1982	1,399	+2.90%
1990	1,556	+1.34%
1999	1,579	+0.16%
2007	1,977	+2.85%
2012	2,226	+2.40%
2017	2,395	+1.47%
2023	2,585	+1.28%
Source: INSEE

== See also ==
- Communes of the Vendée department
