= Grosbreuil =

- Commune
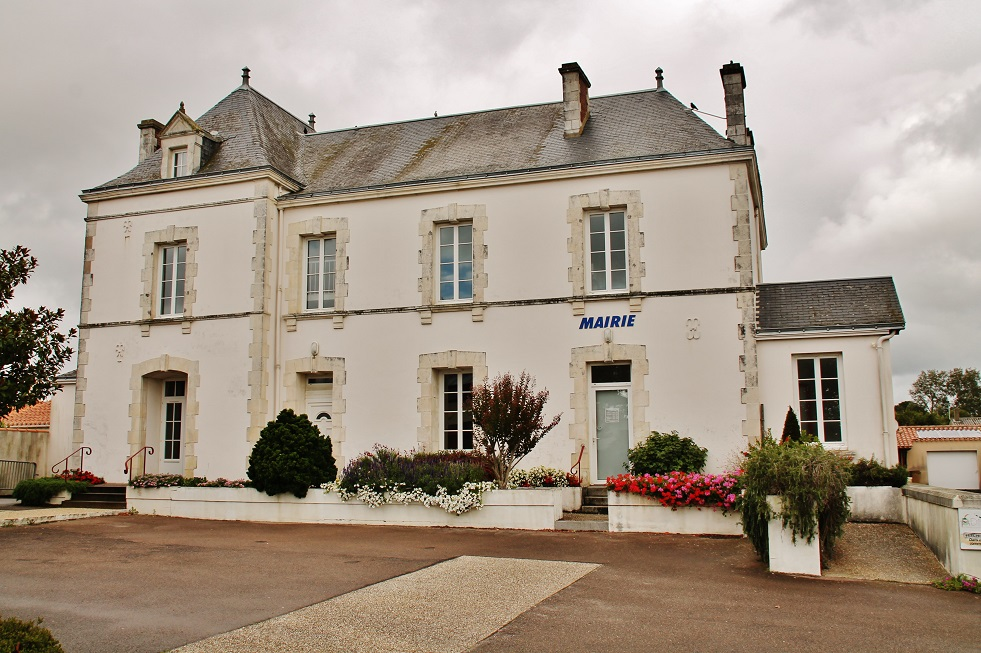
- Town hall of Grosbreuil
- Location of Grosbreuil
- Location within France Location within Pays de la Loire
- Coordinates: 46°32′23″N 1°37′01″W
- Country: France
- Region: Pays de la Loire
- Department: Vendée
- Arrondissement: Les Sables-d'Olonne
- Canton: Talmont-Saint-Hilaire

Government
  - Mayor (2020–2026): Marc Hillairet
- Area^{1}: 36.33 km^{2} (14.03 sq mi)
- Elevation: 40 m (130 ft)
- Highest elevation: 72 m (236 ft)
- Lowest elevation: 10 m (33 ft)
- Population (2023): 2,221
  - Density: 61.13/km^{2} (158.3/sq mi)
- Time zone: UTC+01:00 (CET)
  - Summer (DST): UTC+02:00 (CEST)
- INSEE/Postal code: 85103 /85440
- ^{1} French Land Register data, which excludes lakes, ponds, glaciers > 1 km^{2} (0.386 sq mi or 247 acres) and river estuaries.

Grosbreuil (French pronunciation: [ɡʁobʁœj]) is a commune in the Vendée department in the Pays de la Loire region in western France.

== Population ==
Historical population
Year	Pop.	±% p.a.
1968	1,033	—
1975	961	−1.03%
1982	1,033	+1.04%
1990	1,091	+0.69%
1999	1,257	+1.59%
2007	1,886	+5.20%
2012	2,128	+2.44%
2017	2,177	+0.46%
2023	2,221	+0.33%
Source: INSEE

== See also ==
- Communes of the Vendée department
