= Beaulieu-sous-la-Roche =

- Commune
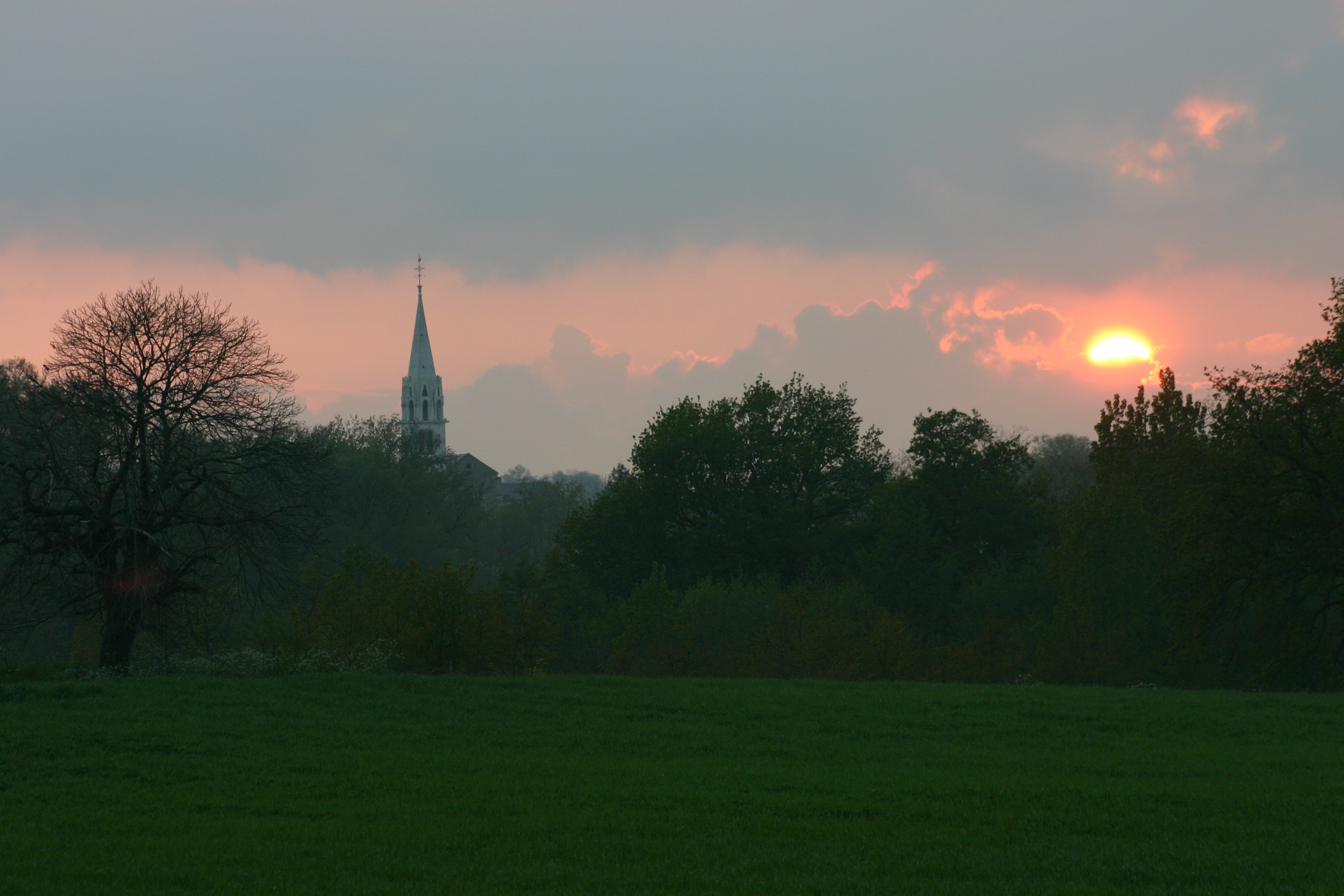
- A view towards the church of Saint-Jean-Baptiste, in Beaulieu-sous-la-Roche

- Coat of arms
- Location of Beaulieu-sous-la-Roche
- Location within France Location within Pays de la Loire
- Coordinates: 46°40′40″N 1°36′32″W
- Country: France
- Region: Pays de la Loire
- Department: Vendée
- Arrondissement: Les Sables-d'Olonne
- Canton: Talmont-Saint-Hilaire

Government
  - Mayor (2025–2026): Nathalie Fraud
- Area^{1}: 25.47 km^{2} (9.83 sq mi)
- Highest elevation: 69 m (226 ft)
- Lowest elevation: 20 m (66 ft)
- Population (2023): 2,421
  - Density: 95.05/km^{2} (246.2/sq mi)
- Time zone: UTC+01:00 (CET)
  - Summer (DST): UTC+02:00 (CEST)
- INSEE/Postal code: 85016 /85190
- ^{1} French Land Register data, which excludes lakes, ponds, glaciers > 1 km^{2} (0.386 sq mi or 247 acres) and river estuaries.

Beaulieu-sous-la-Roche (French pronunciation: [boljø su la ʁɔʃ]) is a commune in the Vendée department in the Pays de la Loire region in western France.

== Population ==
Historical population
Year	Pop.	±% p.a.
1968	1,261	—
1975	1,303	+0.47%
1982	1,482	+1.86%
1990	1,632	+1.21%
1999	1,727	+0.63%
2007	1,935	+1.43%
2012	2,097	+1.62%
2017	2,212	+1.07%
2023	2,421	+1.52%
Source: INSEE

== See also ==
- Communes of the Vendée department
