= La Chapelle-Hermier =

- Commune
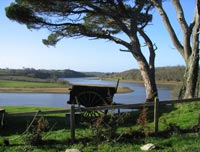
- A view of the Jaunay river at La Chapelle-Hermier.
- Location of La Chapelle-Hermier
- Location within France Location within Pays de la Loire
- Coordinates: 46°41′04″N 1°43′09″W
- Country: France
- Region: Pays de la Loire
- Department: Vendée
- Arrondissement: Les Sables-d'Olonne
- Canton: Talmont-Saint-Hilaire
- Intercommunality: Pays des Achards

Government
  - Mayor (2020–2026): Sébastien Pajot
- Area^{1}: 17.94 km^{2} (6.93 sq mi)
- Highest elevation: 62 m (203 ft)
- Lowest elevation: 6 m (20 ft)
- Population (2023): 1,098
  - Density: 61.20/km^{2} (158.5/sq mi)
- Time zone: UTC+01:00 (CET)
  - Summer (DST): UTC+02:00 (CEST)
- INSEE/Postal code: 85054 /85220
- ^{1} French Land Register data, which excludes lakes, ponds, glaciers > 1 km^{2} (0.386 sq mi or 247 acres) and river estuaries.

La Chapelle-Hermier (French pronunciation: [la ʃapɛl ɛʁmje]) is a commune in the Vendée department in the Pays de la Loire region in western France.

== See also ==
- Communes of the Vendée department
