= Saint-Georges-de-Pointindoux =

- Commune
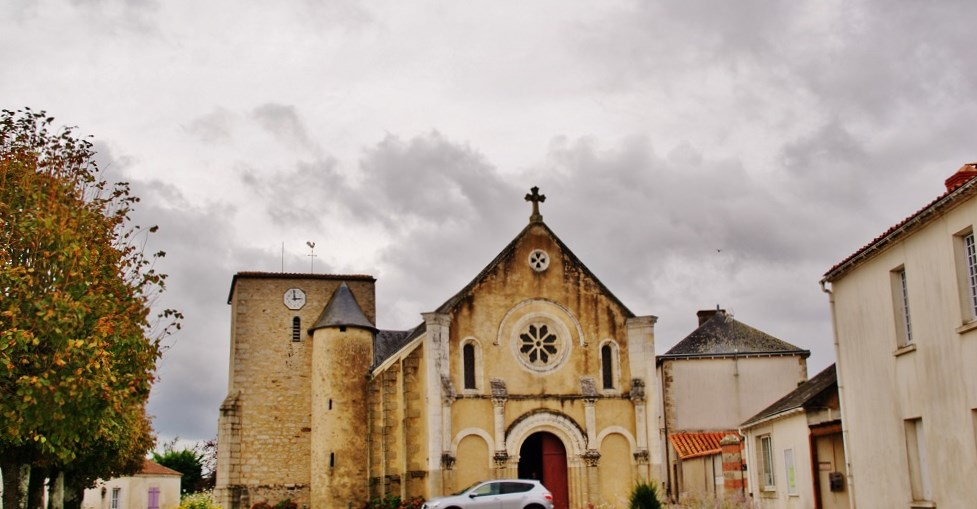
- Location of Saint-Georges-de-Pointindoux
- Location within France Location within Pays de la Loire
- Coordinates: 46°38′44″N 1°37′18″W
- Country: France
- Region: Pays de la Loire
- Department: Vendée
- Arrondissement: Les Sables-d'Olonne
- Canton: Talmont-Saint-Hilaire
- Intercommunality: Pays des Achards

Government
  - Mayor (2020–2026): Jean-François Pérocheau
- Area^{1}: 15.37 km^{2} (5.93 sq mi)
- Highest elevation: 72 m (236 ft)
- Lowest elevation: 18 m (59 ft)
- Population (2023): 1,870
  - Density: 122/km^{2} (315/sq mi)
- Time zone: UTC+01:00 (CET)
  - Summer (DST): UTC+02:00 (CEST)
- INSEE/Postal code: 85218 /85150
- ^{1} French Land Register data, which excludes lakes, ponds, glaciers > 1 km^{2} (0.386 sq mi or 247 acres) and river estuaries.

Saint-Georges-de-Pointindoux (French pronunciation: [sɛ̃ ʒɔʁʒ də pwɛ̃tɛ̃du]) is a commune in the Vendée department in the Pays de la Loire region in western France.

== See also ==
- Communes of the Vendée department
