= Saint-Julien-des-Landes =

- Commune
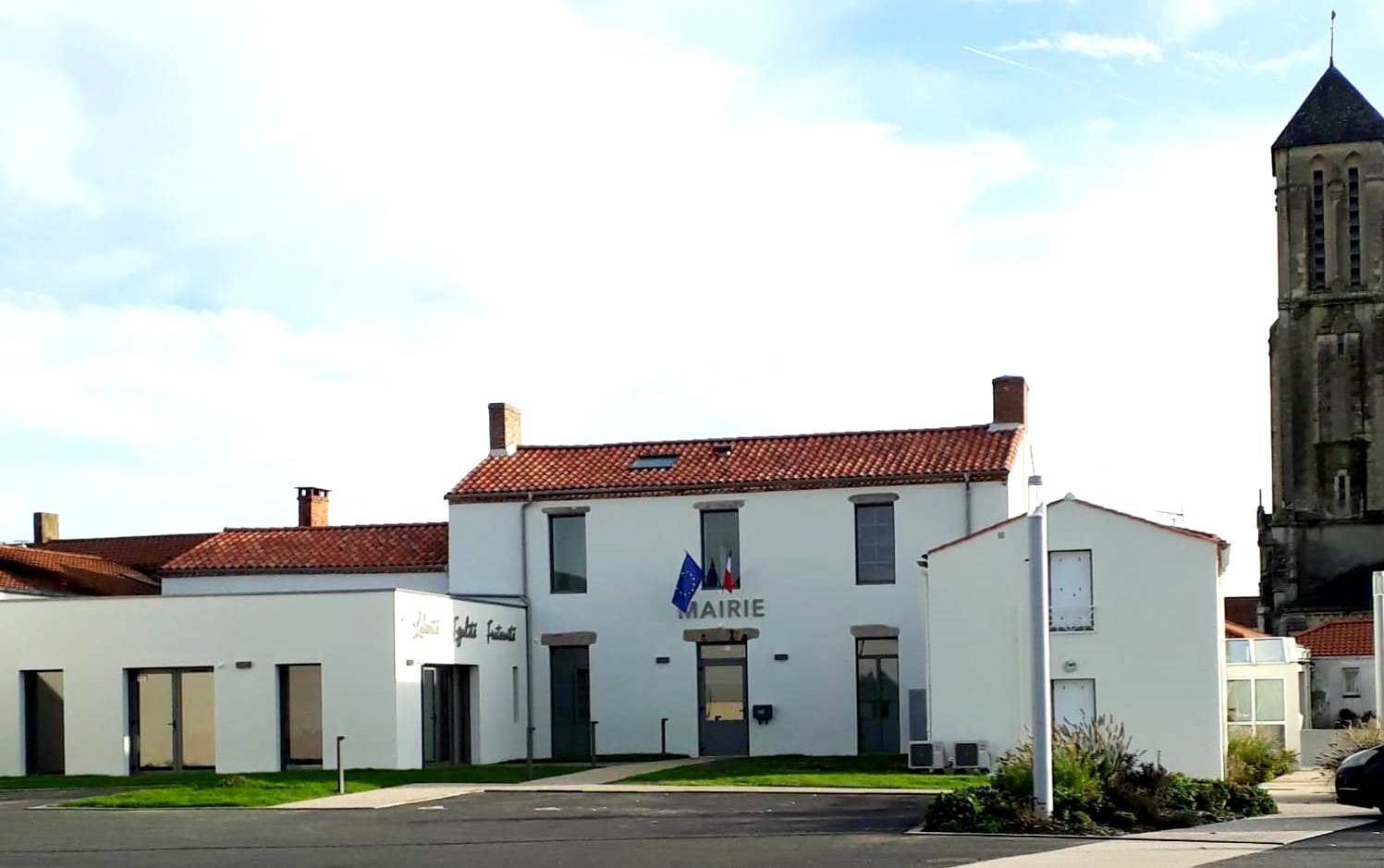
- Town hall of Saint-Julien-des-Landes
- Location of Saint-Julien-des-Landes
- Location within France Location within Pays de la Loire
- Coordinates: 46°38′30″N 1°42′42″W
- Country: France
- Region: Pays de la Loire
- Department: Vendée
- Arrondissement: Les Sables-d'Olonne
- Canton: Talmont-Saint-Hilaire
- Intercommunality: Pays des Achards

Government
  - Mayor (2020–2026): Joël Bret
- Area^{1}: 28.31 km^{2} (10.93 sq mi)
- Highest elevation: 66 m (217 ft)
- Lowest elevation: 7 m (23 ft)
- Population (2023): 2,085
  - Density: 73.65/km^{2} (190.7/sq mi)
- Time zone: UTC+01:00 (CET)
  - Summer (DST): UTC+02:00 (CEST)
- INSEE/Postal code: 85236 /85150
- ^{1} French Land Register data, which excludes lakes, ponds, glaciers > 1 km^{2} (0.386 sq mi or 247 acres) and river estuaries.

Saint-Julien-des-Landes (French pronunciation: [sɛ̃ ʒyljɛ̃ de lɑ̃d]) is a commune in the Vendée department, in the Pays de la Loire region of western France.

== Geography ==
The commune's municipal territory extends to 2,845 hectares. The altitude is 51 metres, and fluctuates from 7m to 66m.

In the north, it is bordered by the river Jaunay.

== Population ==
Historical population
Year	Pop.	±% p.a.
1968	1,012	—
1975	964	−0.69%
1982	1,013	+0.71%
1990	1,075	+0.75%
1999	1,105	+0.31%
2007	1,288	+1.93%
2012	1,528	+3.48%
2017	1,773	+3.02%
2023	2,085	+2.74%
Source: INSEE

== Tourism ==
The commune is host to two large campsites: Camping Chateau La Forêt within the village and la garangeoire just outside.

== Politics ==
Mayors
Period		Person	Party	Role
1888	1892	Edmond de La Roche-Saint-André	Right (Droite)	General Counsellor
1986	2001	Michel Rabiller	Miscellaneous right (DVD)	Bank Exec
24 March 2001	Currently	Joël Bret	Miscellaneous right (DVD)	Bank Exec

== See also ==
- Communes of the Vendée department
