= Saint-Vincent-sur-Jard =

- Commune
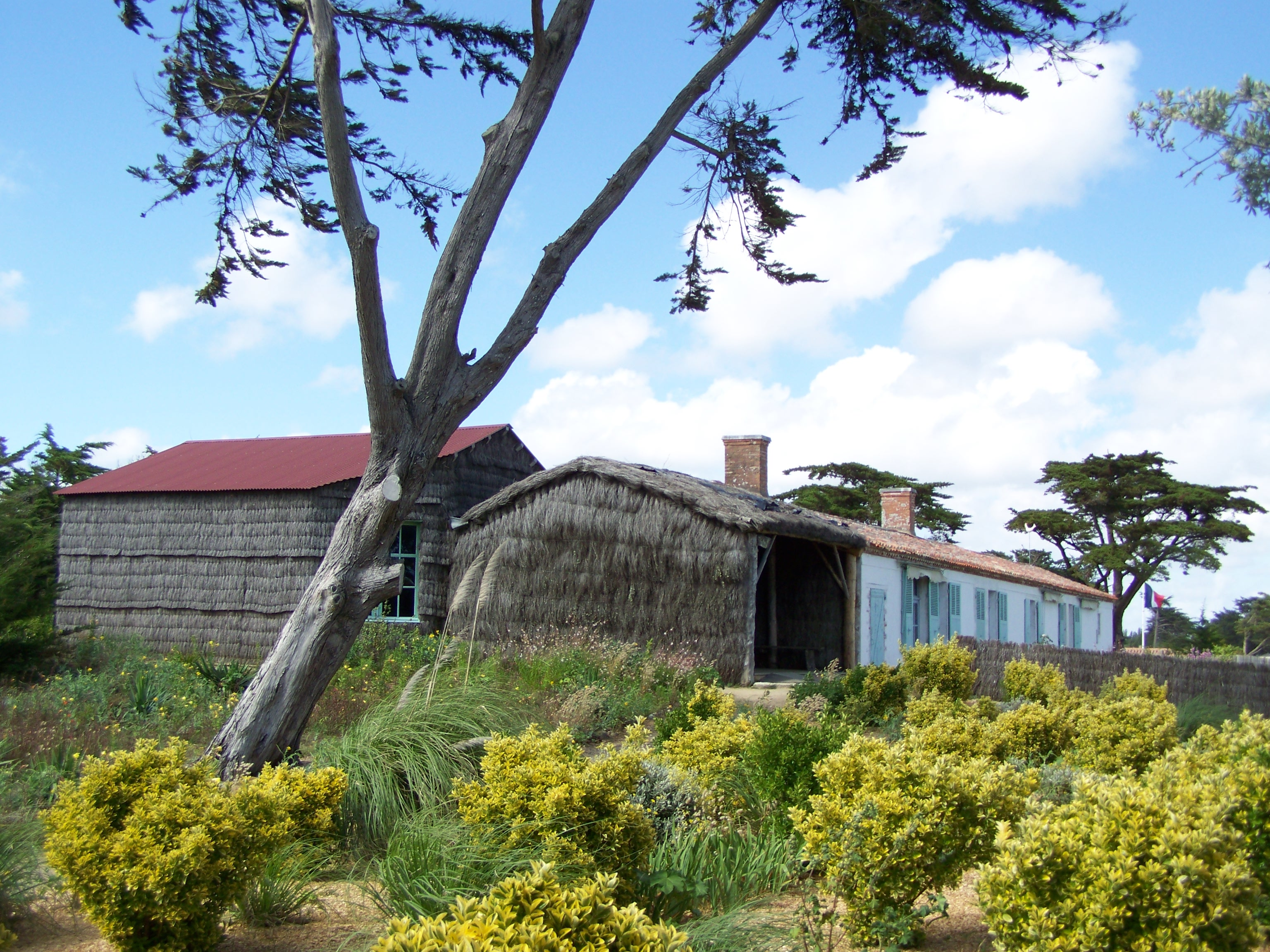
- The Georges Clemenceau House
- Location of Saint-Vincent-sur-Jard
- Location within France Location within Pays de la Loire
- Coordinates: 46°24′56″N 1°32′49″W
- Country: France
- Region: Pays de la Loire
- Department: Vendée
- Arrondissement: Les Sables-d'Olonne
- Canton: Talmont-Saint-Hilaire

Government
  - Mayor (2023–2026): Olivier Dalmasso
- Area^{1}: 14.65 km^{2} (5.66 sq mi)
- Elevation: 10 m (33 ft)
- Highest elevation: 23 m (75 ft)
- Lowest elevation: 1 m (3.3 ft)
- Population (2023): 1,741
  - Density: 118.8/km^{2} (307.8/sq mi)
- Time zone: UTC+01:00 (CET)
  - Summer (DST): UTC+02:00 (CEST)
- INSEE/Postal code: 85278 /85520
- ^{1} French Land Register data, which excludes lakes, ponds, glaciers > 1 km^{2} (0.386 sq mi or 247 acres) and river estuaries.

Saint-Vincent-sur-Jard (French pronunciation: [sɛ̃ vɛ̃sɑ̃ syʁ ʒaʁ], literally Saint-Vincent on Jard) is a commune in the Vendée department in the Pays de la Loire region in western France. Georges Clemenceau, French Prime Minister during World War I, would spend his remaining years here after retiring from political life in 1920, up until his death in 1929.

== See also ==
- Communes of the Vendée department
