= La Jonchère =

- Commune
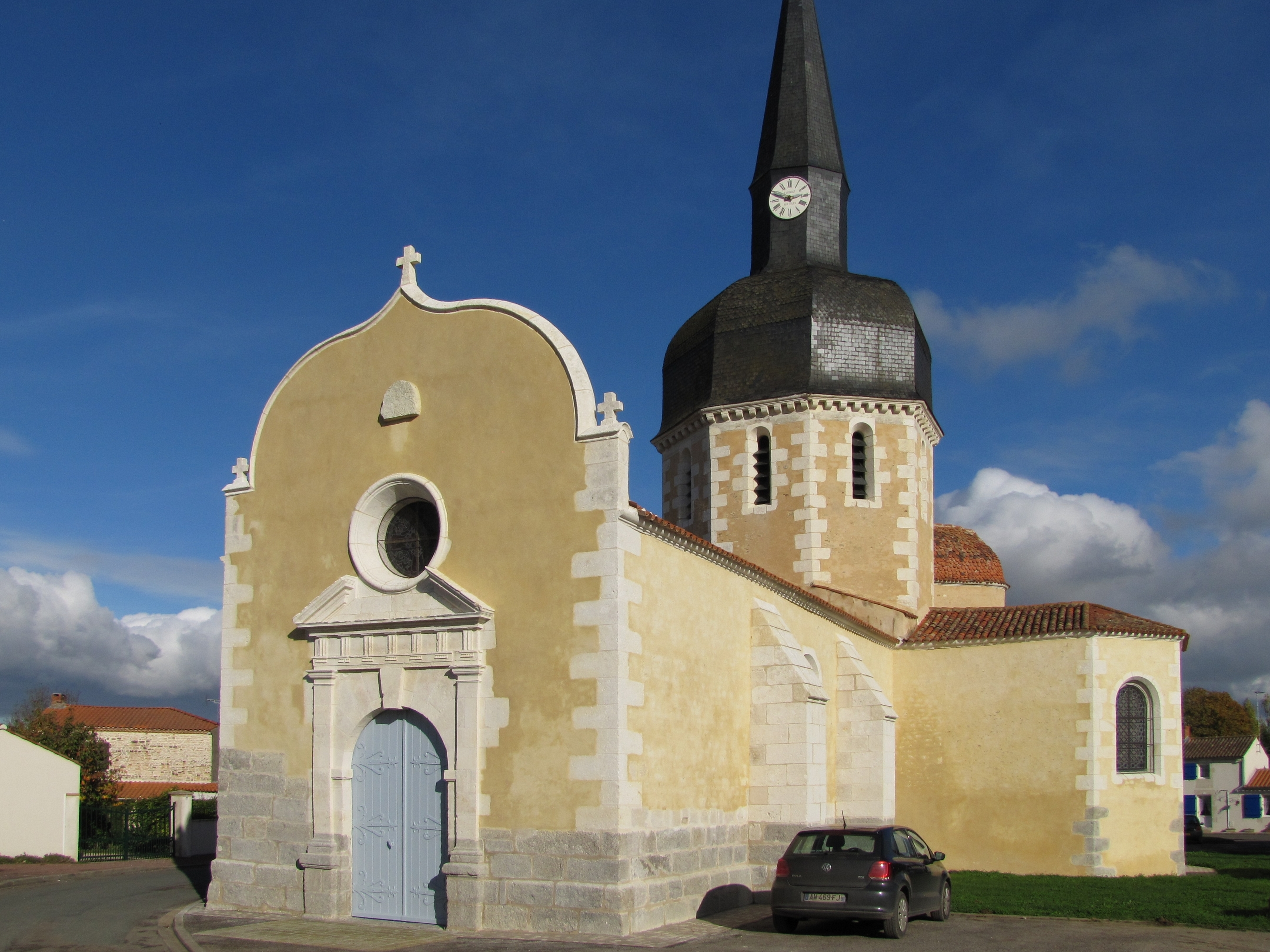
- The church of Saint-Martin, in La Jonchère

- Coat of arms
- Location of La Jonchère
- Location within France Location within Pays de la Loire
- Coordinates: 46°27′26″N 1°22′25″W
- Country: France
- Region: Pays de la Loire
- Department: Vendée
- Arrondissement: Les Sables-d'Olonne
- Canton: Mareuil-sur-Lay-Dissais

Government
  - Mayor (2020–2026): Marc Bouillaud
- Area^{1}: 11.50 km^{2} (4.44 sq mi)
- Highest elevation: 35 m (115 ft)
- Lowest elevation: 2 m (6.6 ft)
- Population (2023): 498
  - Density: 43.3/km^{2} (112/sq mi)
- Time zone: UTC+01:00 (CET)
  - Summer (DST): UTC+02:00 (CEST)
- INSEE/Postal code: 85116 /85540
- ^{1} French Land Register data, which excludes lakes, ponds, glaciers > 1 km^{2} (0.386 sq mi or 247 acres) and river estuaries.

La Jonchère (French pronunciation: [la ʒɔ̃ʃɛʁ]) is a commune in the Vendée department in the Pays de la Loire region in western France.

== See also ==
- Communes of the Vendée department
