= Saint-Mathurin =

- Commune
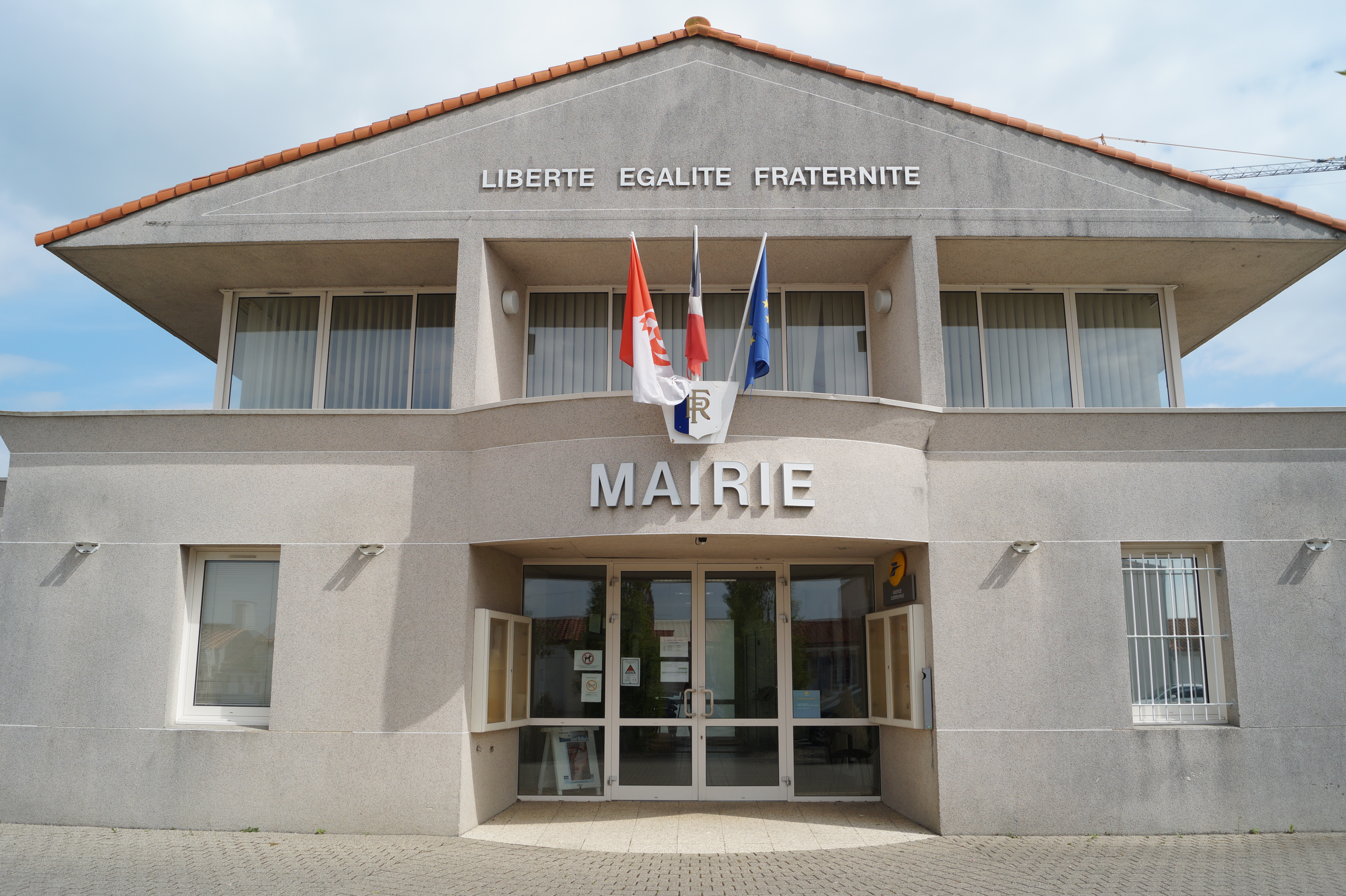
- Town hall

- Coat of arms
- Location of Saint-Mathurin
- Location within France Location within Pays de la Loire
- Coordinates: 46°33′57″N 1°42′48″W
- Country: France
- Region: Pays de la Loire
- Department: Vendée
- Arrondissement: Les Sables-d'Olonne
- Canton: Talmont-Saint-Hilaire
- Intercommunality: Les Sables d'Olonne Agglomération

Government
  - Mayor (2020–2026): Albert Bouard
- Area^{1}: 23.51 km^{2} (9.08 sq mi)
- Highest elevation: 44 m (144 ft)
- Lowest elevation: 1 m (3.3 ft)
- Population (2023): 2,496
  - Density: 106.2/km^{2} (275.0/sq mi)
- Time zone: UTC+01:00 (CET)
  - Summer (DST): UTC+02:00 (CEST)
- INSEE/Postal code: 85250 /85150
- ^{1} French Land Register data, which excludes lakes, ponds, glaciers > 1 km^{2} (0.386 sq mi or 247 acres) and river estuaries.

Saint-Mathurin (French pronunciation: [sɛ̃ matyʁɛ̃]) is a commune in the Vendée department in the Pays de la Loire region in western France.

== Population ==
Historical population
| Year | Pop. | ±% p.a. |
|---|---|---|
| 1968 | 783 | — |
| 1975 | 756 | −0.50% |
| 1982 | 1,075 | +5.16% |
| 1990 | 1,137 | +0.70% |
| 1999 | 1,256 | +1.11% |
| 2007 | 1,676 | +3.67% |
| 2012 | 2,080 | +4.41% |
| 2017 | 2,270 | +1.76% |
| 2023 | 2,496 | +1.59% |
Source: INSEE

== See also ==
- Communes of the Vendée department
