= Saint-Hilaire-la-Forêt =

- Commune
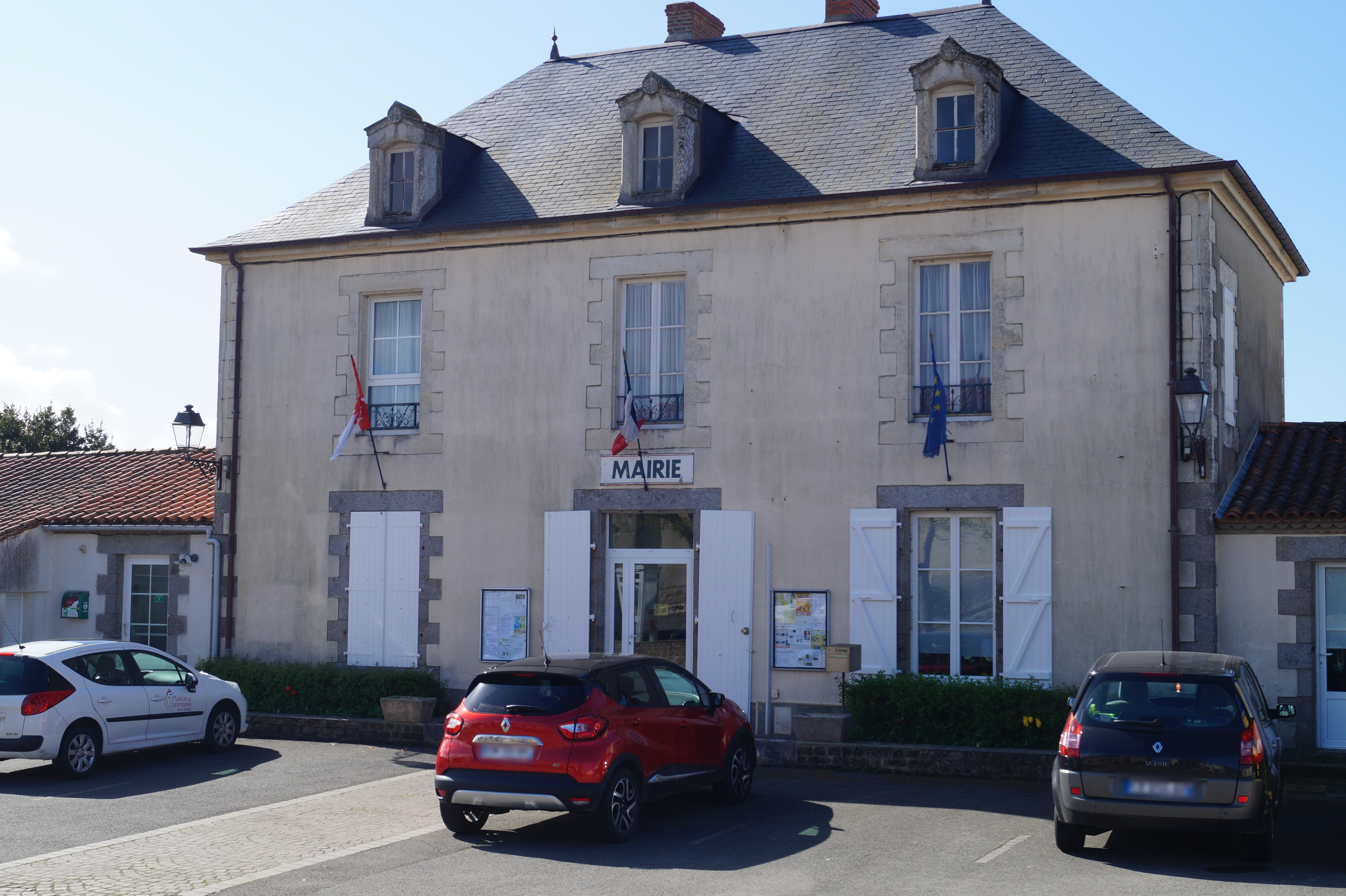
- Town hall of Saint-Hilaire-la-Forêt

- Coat of arms
- Location of Saint-Hilaire-la-Forêt
- Location within France Location within Pays de la Loire
- Coordinates: 46°26′56″N 1°31′30″W
- Country: France
- Region: Pays de la Loire
- Department: Vendée
- Arrondissement: Les Sables-d'Olonne
- Canton: Talmont-Saint-Hilaire

Government
  - Mayor (2020–2026): Christian Baty
- Area^{1}: 10.88 km^{2} (4.20 sq mi)
- Elevation: 25 m (82 ft)
- Highest elevation: 38 m (125 ft)
- Lowest elevation: 2 m (6.6 ft)
- Population (2023): 846
  - Density: 77.8/km^{2} (201/sq mi)
- Time zone: UTC+01:00 (CET)
  - Summer (DST): UTC+02:00 (CEST)
- INSEE/Postal code: 85231 /85440
- ^{1} French Land Register data, which excludes lakes, ponds, glaciers > 1 km^{2} (0.386 sq mi or 247 acres) and river estuaries.

Saint-Hilaire-la-Forêt (French pronunciation: [sɛ̃.t‿ilɛʁ la fɔʁɛ]) is a commune in the Vendée department in the Pays de la Loire region in western France.

== See also ==
- Communes of the Vendée department
