= Le Bernard =

- Commune
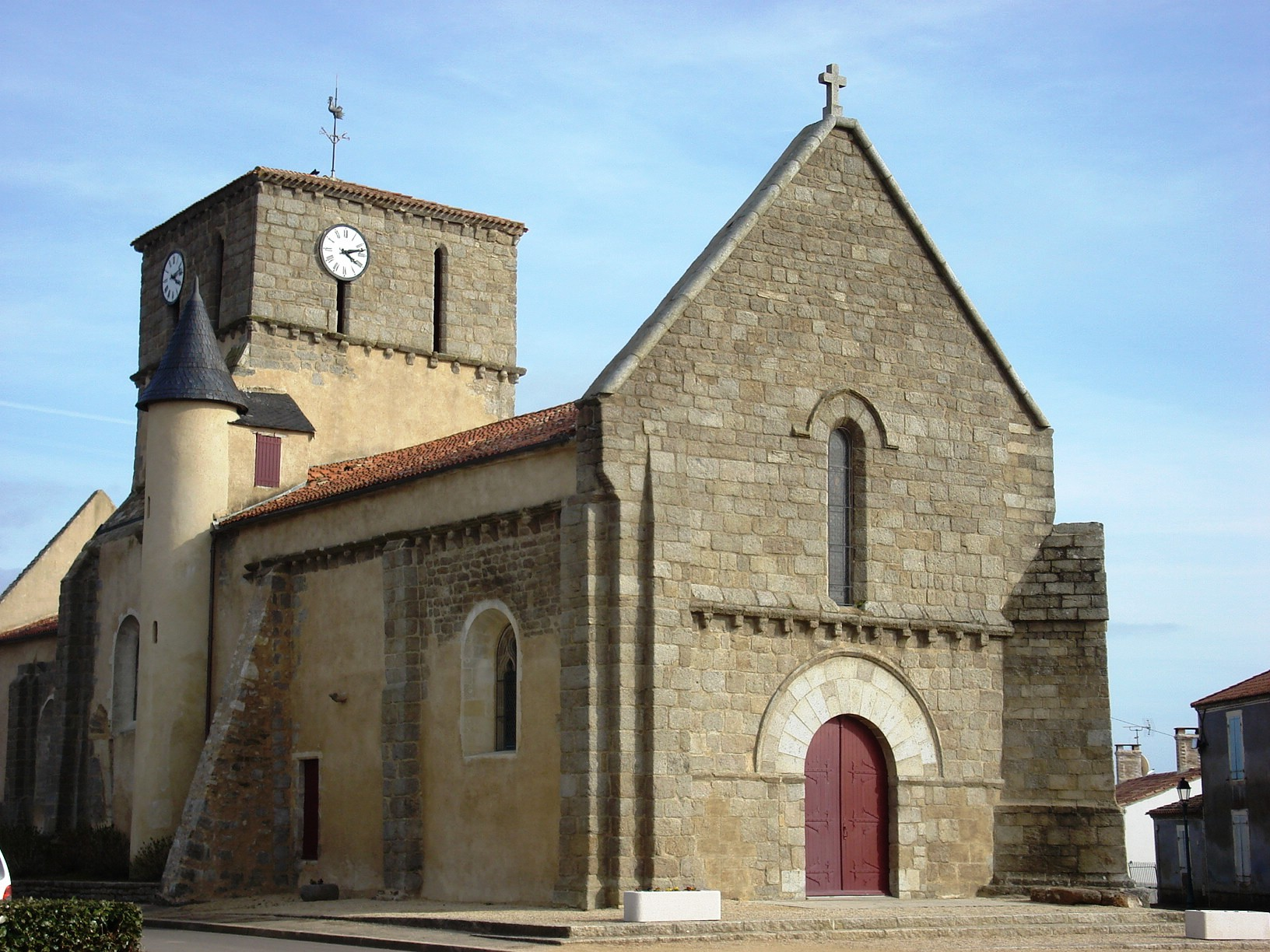
- The church of Saint-Martin-de-Tours, in Bernard

- Coat of arms
- Location of Le Bernard
- Location within France Location within Pays de la Loire
- Coordinates: 46°26′20″N 1°28′04″W
- Country: France
- Region: Pays de la Loire
- Department: Vendée
- Arrondissement: Les Sables-d'Olonne
- Canton: Talmont-Saint-Hilaire

Government
  - Mayor (2020–2026): Loïc Chusseau
- Area^{1}: 27.37 km^{2} (10.57 sq mi)
- Elevation: 26 m (85 ft)
- Highest elevation: 55 m (180 ft)
- Lowest elevation: 2 m (6.6 ft)
- Population (2023): 1,319
  - Density: 48.19/km^{2} (124.8/sq mi)
- Time zone: UTC+01:00 (CET)
  - Summer (DST): UTC+02:00 (CEST)
- INSEE/Postal code: 85022 /85560
- ^{1} French Land Register data, which excludes lakes, ponds, glaciers > 1 km^{2} (0.386 sq mi or 247 acres) and river estuaries.

Le Bernard (French pronunciation: [lə bɛʁnaʁ]) is a commune in the Vendée department in the Pays de la Loire region in western France.

== See also ==
- Communes of the Vendée department
