= Saint-Avaugourd-des-Landes =

- Commune
- Coat of arms
- Location of Saint-Avaugourd-des-Landes
- Location within France Location within Pays de la Loire
- Coordinates: 46°30′53″N 1°29′00″W
- Country: France
- Region: Pays de la Loire
- Department: Vendée
- Arrondissement: Les Sables-d'Olonne
- Canton: Mareuil-sur-Lay-Dissais

Government
  - Mayor (2022–2026): Alain Rochereau
- Area^{1}: 20.85 km^{2} (8.05 sq mi)
- Highest elevation: 77 m (253 ft)
- Lowest elevation: 35 m (115 ft)
- Population (2023): 1,213
  - Density: 58.18/km^{2} (150.7/sq mi)
- Time zone: UTC+01:00 (CET)
  - Summer (DST): UTC+02:00 (CEST)
- INSEE/Postal code: 85200 /85540
- ^{1} French Land Register data, which excludes lakes, ponds, glaciers > 1 km^{2} (0.386 sq mi or 247 acres) and river estuaries.

Saint-Avaugourd-des-Landes (French pronunciation: [sɛ̃.t‿avoɡuʁ de lɑ̃d]) is a commune in the Vendée department in the Pays de la Loire region in western France.

== See also ==
- Communes of the Vendée department
