= Sainte-Foy, Vendée =

Sainte-Foy
- Commune
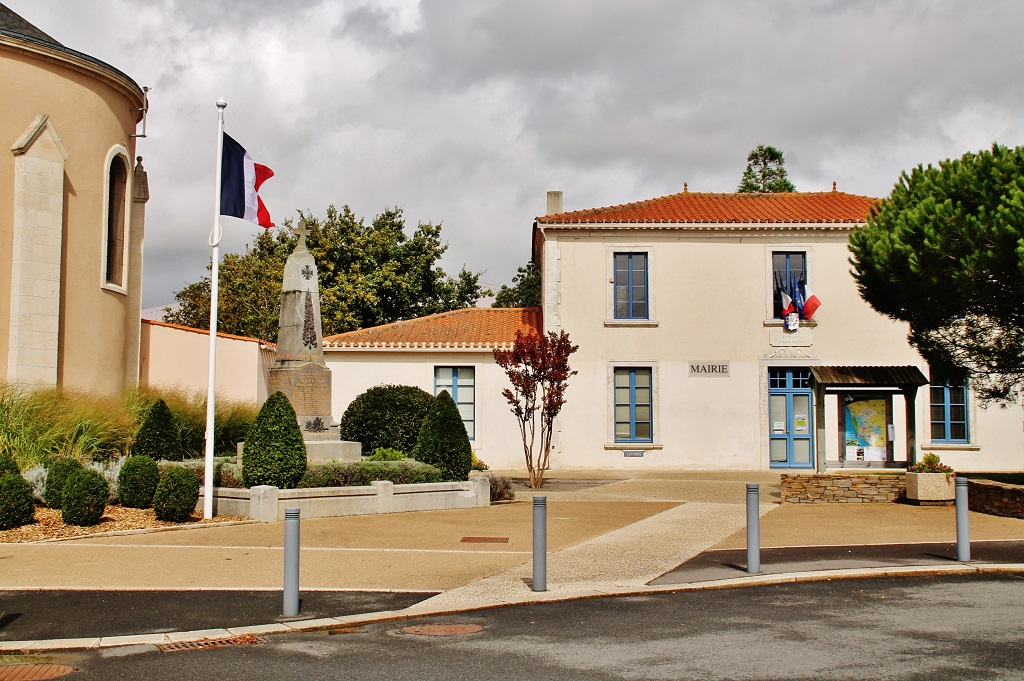
- Location of Sainte-Foy
- Location within France Location within Pays de la Loire
- Coordinates: 46°32′45″N 1°40′10″W
- Country: France
- Region: Pays de la Loire
- Department: Vendée
- Arrondissement: Les Sables-d'Olonne
- Canton: Talmont-Saint-Hilaire
- Intercommunality: Les Sables d'Olonne Agglomération

Government
  - Mayor (2020–2026): Noël Verdon
- Area^{1}: 15.62 km^{2} (6.03 sq mi)
- Highest elevation: 59 m (194 ft)
- Lowest elevation: 1 m (3.3 ft)
- Population (2023): 2,717
  - Density: 173.9/km^{2} (450.5/sq mi)
- Time zone: UTC+01:00 (CET)
  - Summer (DST): UTC+02:00 (CEST)
- INSEE/Postal code: 85214 /85150
- ^{1} French Land Register data, which excludes lakes, ponds, glaciers > 1 km^{2} (0.386 sq mi or 247 acres) and river estuaries.

Sainte-Foy (French pronunciation: [sɛ̃t fwa]) is a commune in the Vendée department in the Pays de la Loire region in western France.

== Population ==
Historical population
Year	Pop.	±% p.a.
1968	579	—
1975	546	−0.83%
1982	640	+2.30%
1990	823	+3.19%
1999	1,357	+5.71%
2007	1,755	+3.27%
2012	1,855	+1.11%
2017	2,215	+3.61%
2023	2,717	+3.46%
Source: INSEE

== See also ==
- Communes of the Vendée department
