= Jard-sur-Mer =

- Commune
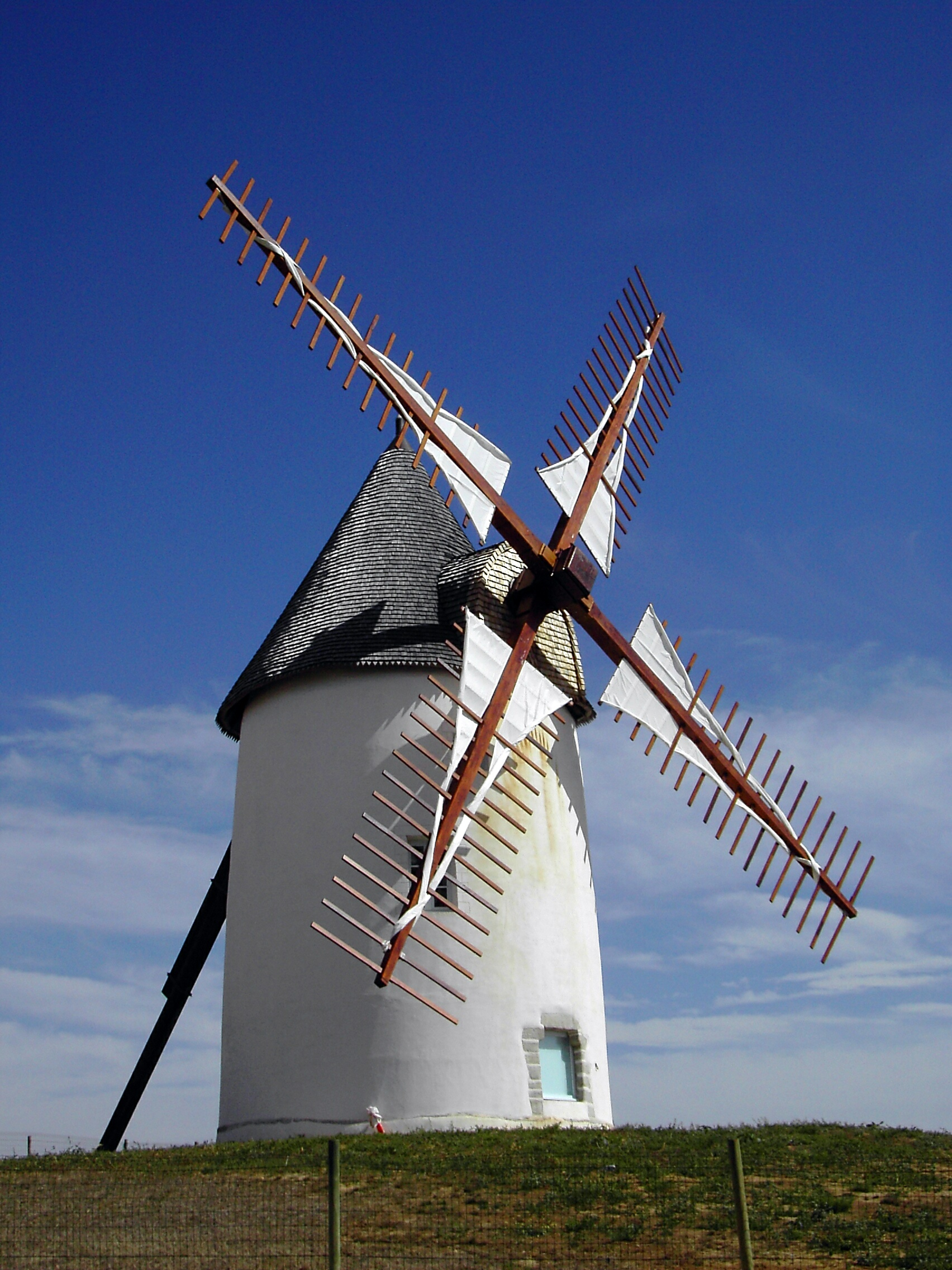
- The windmill in Jard-sur-Mer

- Coat of arms
- Location of Jard-sur-Mer
- Location within France Location within Pays de la Loire
- Coordinates: 46°25′02″N 1°34′32″W
- Country: France
- Region: Pays de la Loire
- Department: Vendée
- Arrondissement: Les Sables-d'Olonne
- Canton: Talmont-Saint-Hilaire

Government
  - Mayor (2020–2026): Sonia Gindreau
- Area^{1}: 16.57 km^{2} (6.40 sq mi)
- Elevation: 13 m (43 ft)
- Highest elevation: 24 m (79 ft)
- Lowest elevation: 1 m (3.3 ft)
- Population (2023): 3,235
  - Density: 195.2/km^{2} (505.6/sq mi)
- Time zone: UTC+01:00 (CET)
  - Summer (DST): UTC+02:00 (CEST)
- INSEE/Postal code: 85114 /85520
- ^{1} French Land Register data, which excludes lakes, ponds, glaciers > 1 km^{2} (0.386 sq mi or 247 acres) and river estuaries.

Jard-sur-Mer (French pronunciation: [ʒaʁ syʁ mɛʁ]; lit. 'Jard-on-Sea') is a commune in the Vendée department in the Pays de la Loire region in Western France.

== Population ==
Historical population
Year	Pop.	±% p.a.
1968	1,242	—
1975	1,413	+1.86%
1982	1,612	+1.90%
1990	1,817	+1.51%
1999	2,235	+2.33%
2007	2,480	+1.31%
2012	2,635	+1.22%
2017	2,653	+0.14%
2023	3,235	+3.36%
Source: INSEE

== See also ==
- Communes of the Vendée department
