= Maillé, Vendée =

Maillé
- Commune
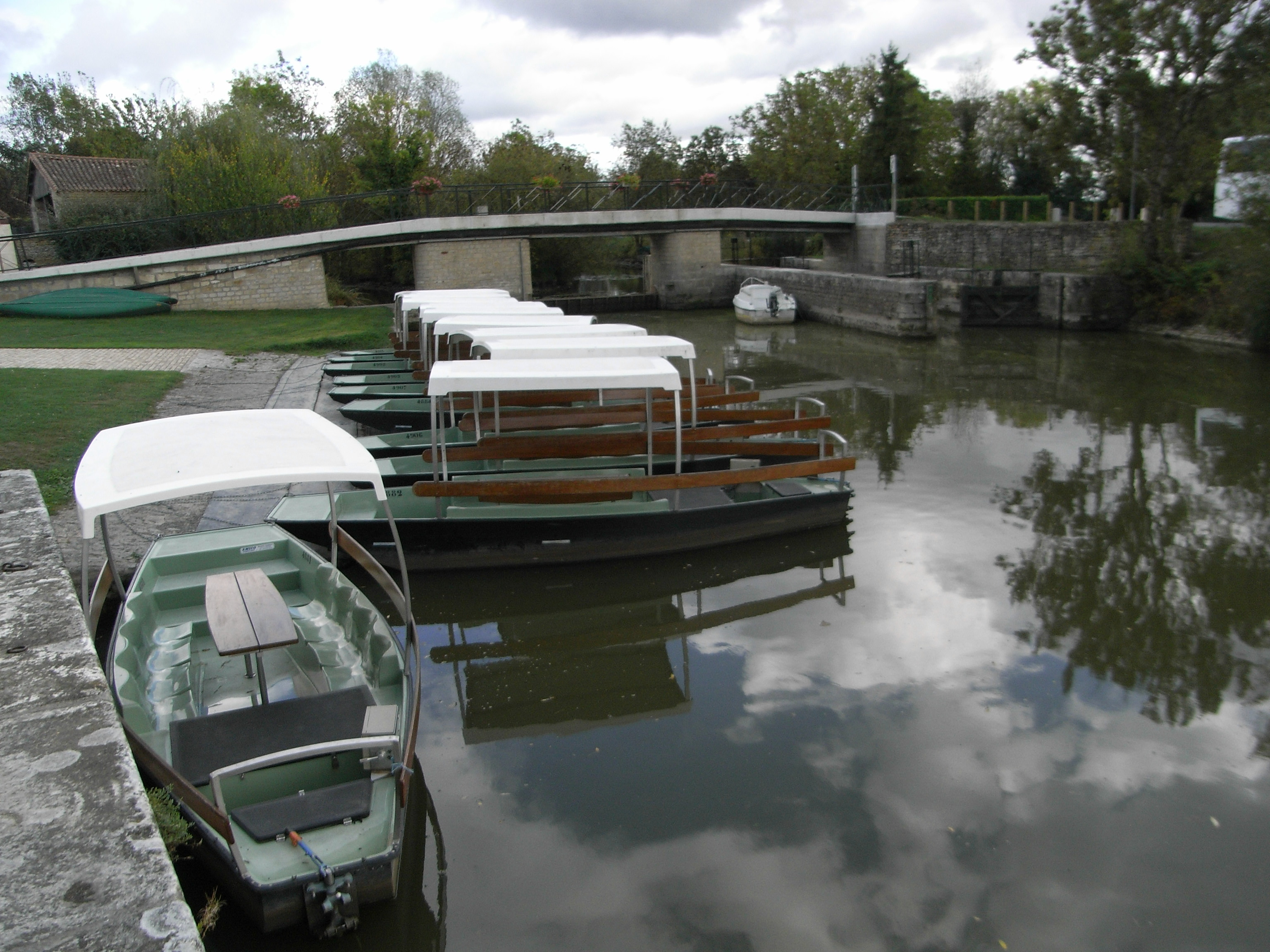
- The marina and the lock on the Sevre river
- Location of Maillé
- Location within France Location within Pays de la Loire
- Coordinates: 46°20′36″N 0°47′19″W
- Country: France
- Region: Pays de la Loire
- Department: Vendée
- Arrondissement: Fontenay-le-Comte
- Canton: Fontenay-le-Comte
- Intercommunality: Vendée Sèvre Autise

Government
  - Mayor (2020–2026): Jean-Marie Gelot
- Area^{1}: 17.66 km^{2} (6.82 sq mi)
- Highest elevation: 13 m (43 ft)
- Lowest elevation: 1 m (3.3 ft)
- Population (2023): 759
  - Density: 43.0/km^{2} (111/sq mi)
- Time zone: UTC+01:00 (CET)
  - Summer (DST): UTC+02:00 (CEST)
- INSEE/Postal code: 85132 /85420
- ^{1} French Land Register data, which excludes lakes, ponds, glaciers > 1 km^{2} (0.386 sq mi or 247 acres) and river estuaries.

Maillé (French pronunciation: [maje]) is a commune in the Vendée department in the Pays de la Loire region in western France. The musicologist Damien Poisblaud (born 1961) was born in Maillé, as was Jean René Constant Quoy (1790–1869), naval surgeon, zoologist and anatomist.

== See also ==
- Communes of the Vendée department
