= Silvacane Abbey =

Abbey in Bouches-du-Rhône, France

Coordinates: 43°42′58″N 5°19′45″E

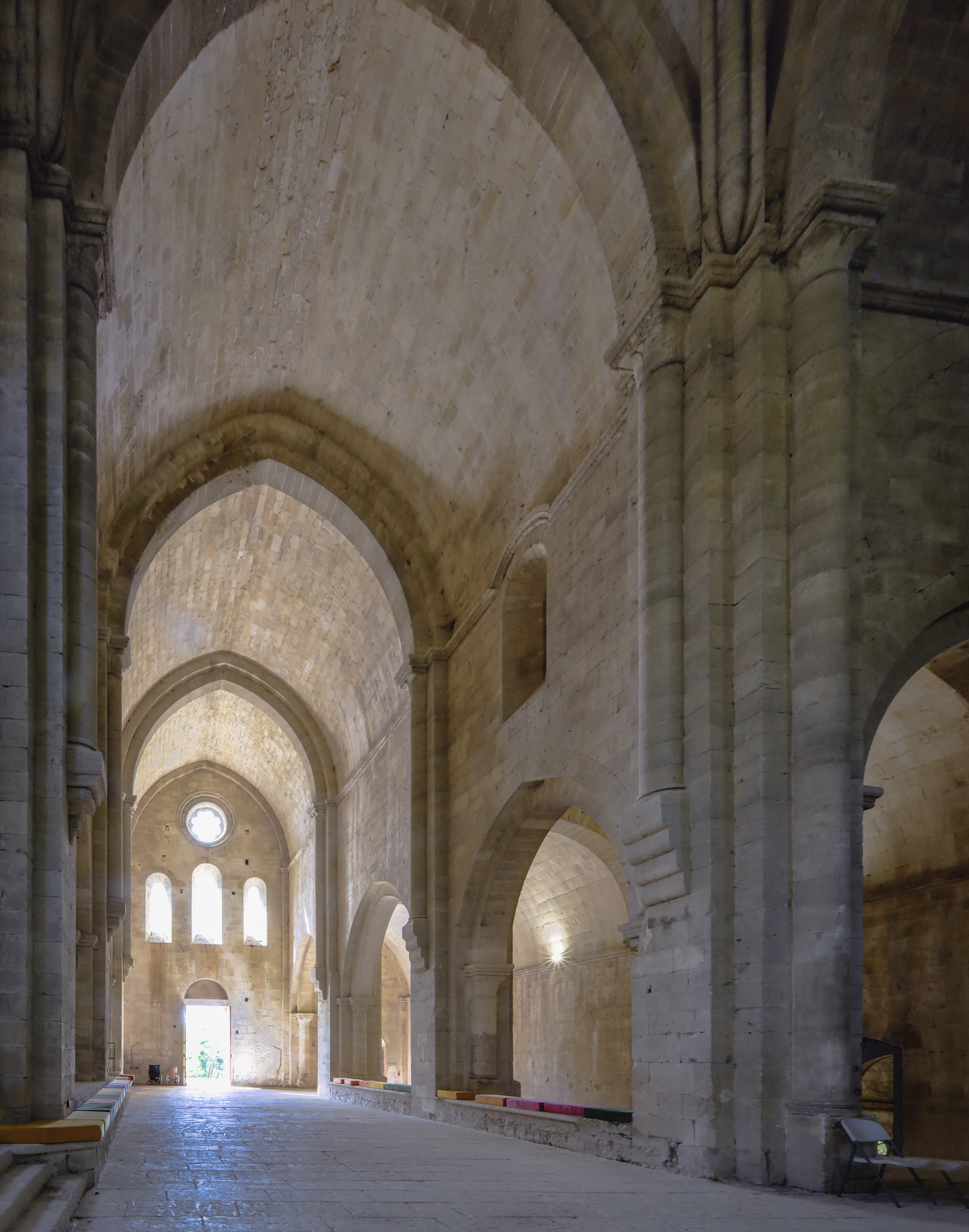
The nave with pointed barrel vault

Silvacane Abbey is a former Cistercian monastery in the municipality of La Roque-d'Anthéron, Bouches-du-Rhône, in Provence, France. It was founded in or around 1144 as a daughter house of Morimond Abbey and was dissolved in 1443; it ceased to be an ecclesiastical property in the French Revolution. The church was acquired by the French state in 1846, the remaining buildings not until 1949. It is one of the three Cistercian abbeys in Provence known as the "three sisters of Provence" ("les trois soeurs provençales"), the other two being Sénanque Abbey and Le Thoronet Abbey; Silvacane was possibly the last-established.

The structures, of the late 12th and 13th centuries, are mostly Romanesque, with some Gothic elements. As is usual with early Cistercian buildings, the focus of the architecture is entirely on simplicity, austerity and harmony. The church interior, without decoration or distraction, is an outstanding example of 12th century Cistercian architecture.

== History ==
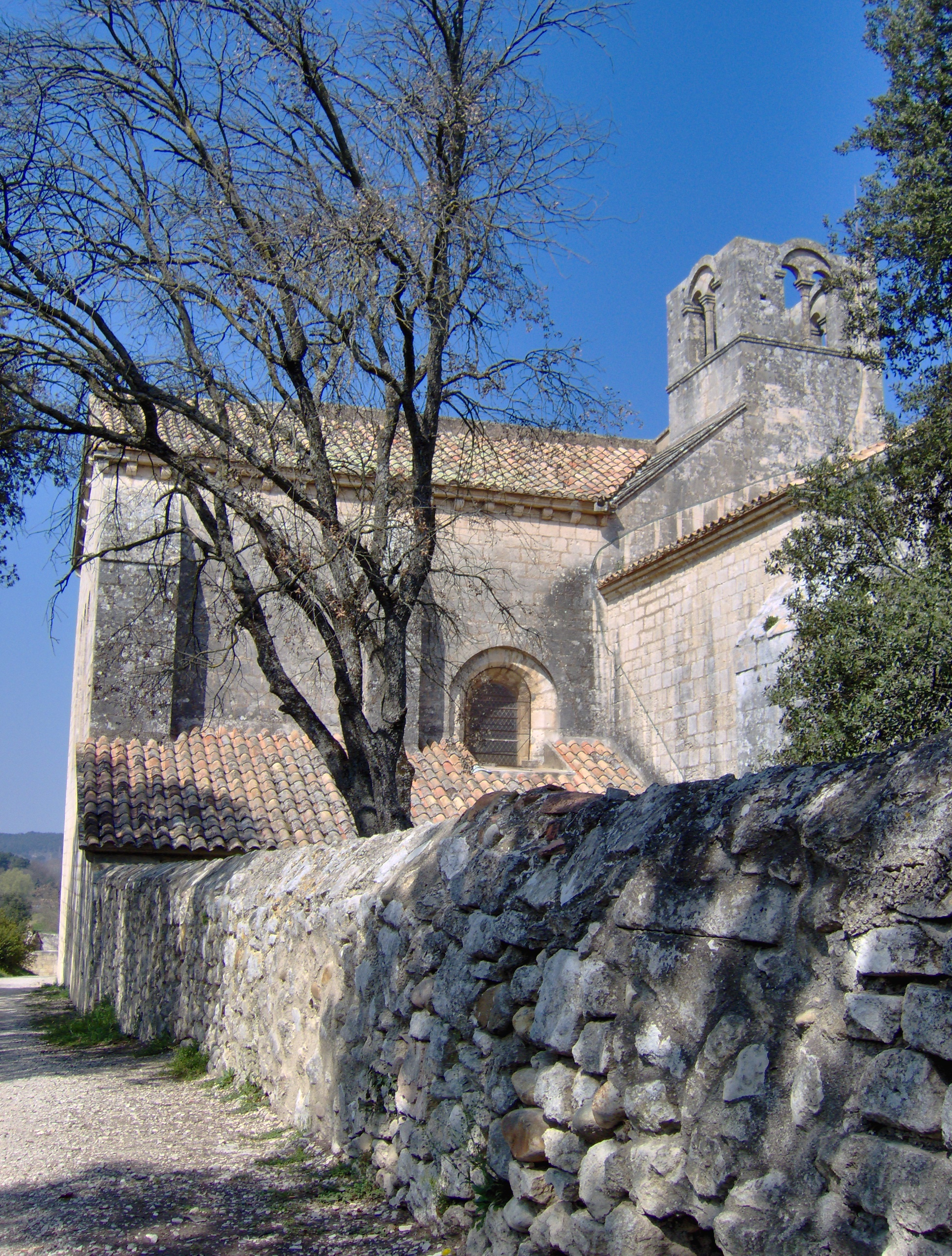

Like all Cistercian monasteries of the time, Silvacane was sited in a remote location next to a river or stream, in this case the Durance River, in an area overgrown with reeds.

The abbey became prosperous towards the end of the 12th century when it received valuable endowments from Guillaume de Fuveau and Raimond de Baux. This wealth however provoked the envy of the Benedictines of Montmajour Abbey near Arles, who attacked Silvacane in 1289 and took the Cistercians hostage (they were later released, after much negotiation).

In 1358 the abbey was plundered by the troops of the army of Aubignan, and from this time on its financial problems grew, until in 1443 the monks were obliged to abandon the abbey. The buildings became the property of the chapter of Aix Cathedral and the church was turned into the parish church of La Roque-d’Anthéron.

The buildings fell into disrepair during the 17th and 18th centuries. The abbey premises were auctioned off during the French Revolution and became a farm. After the site had passed through a number of private hands the church was bought by the French government in 1846 and declared an historical monument, and restoration work initiated. The other buildings of the complex received little attention, however; the state did not acquire them until 1949, and serious restoration took place only in the 1990s.

== Architecture ==
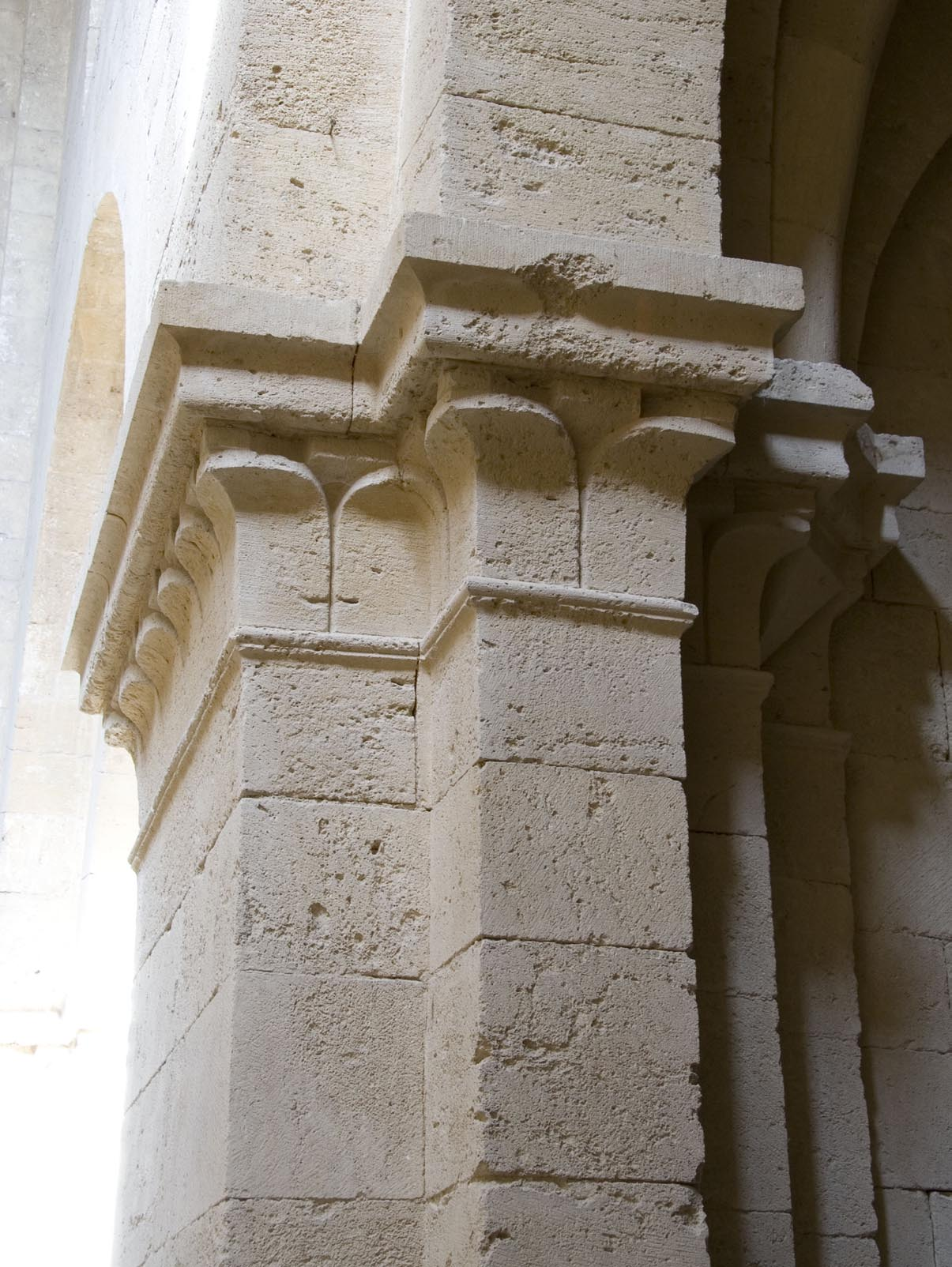
Foliage motif on a pilaster inside church

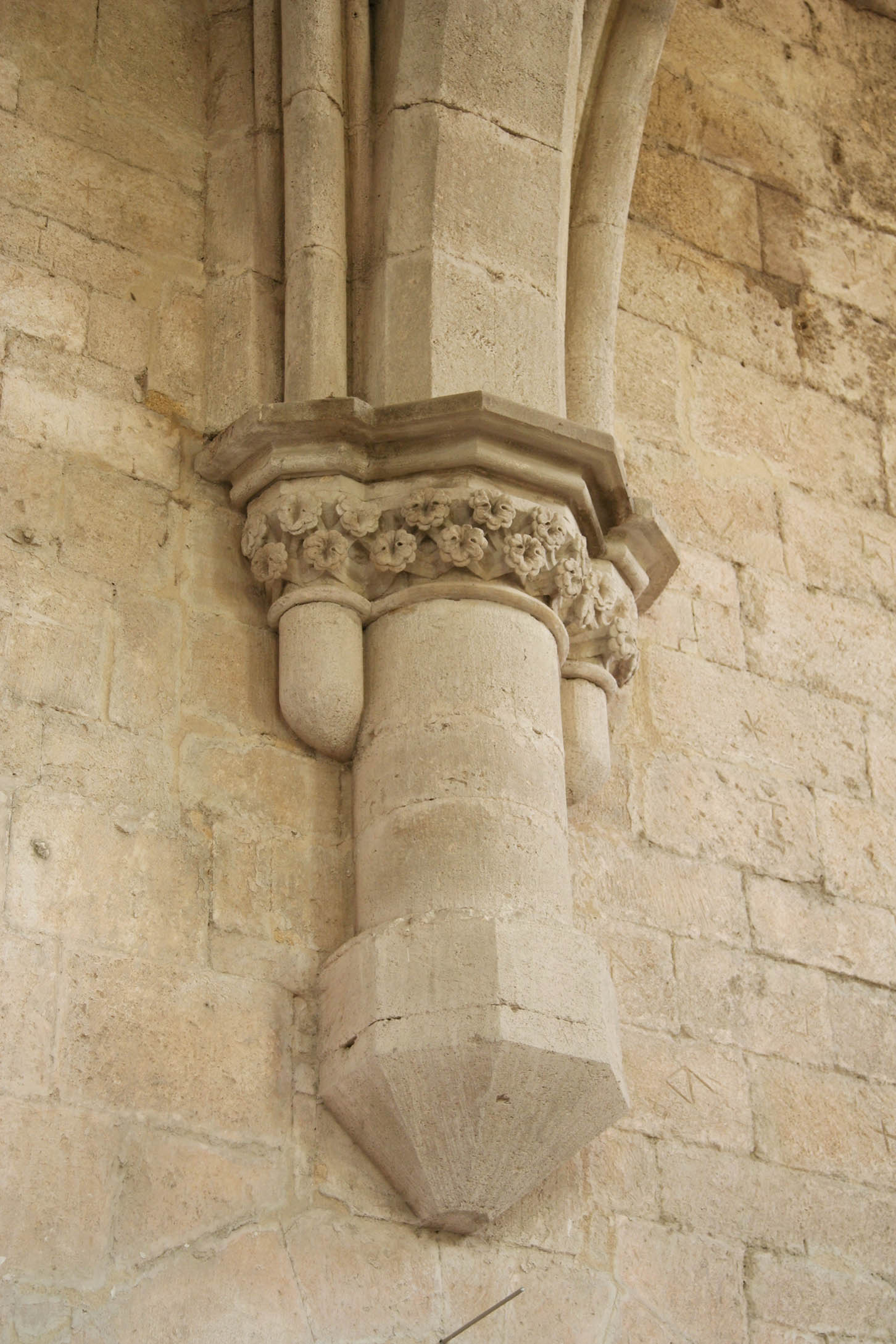
Floral ornaments at an arch base (springer)

The abbey church was constructed between 1175 and 1230 in predominantly Romanesque style with some Gothic elements on the highest part of the terrain. The building, a basilica with transepts, has a pointed barrel vault, with a plain ribbed vault at the crossing, on substantial cruciform columns, the capitals of which, in the form of very simple foliage motifs, are very finely carved.

The chapter house and the day-room, in the east range, and the cloister were all constructed in the 13th century, the cloister with plain Romanesque arches and the day room has a Gothic vaulted ceiling, also of the 13th century.

To the north of the cloister is the refectory, rebuilt in the late 13th century in the more elaborate rayonnant Gothic style. This is the most ornate of the monastery buildings, built at a time when the order had relaxed some of the more rigorous rules of Bernard of Clairvaux.

== Present use ==
The church and other buildings are no longer used for religious purposes. The buildings are prime examples of the Romanesque architecture of Provence. They are open to the public and are sometimes used for cultural events, including the Piano Festival de La Roque-d'Anthéron, the Silvacane Festival of Vocal Music at Silvacane, and the Festival International de Quatuors à Cordes du Luberon.

== Photo gallery ==
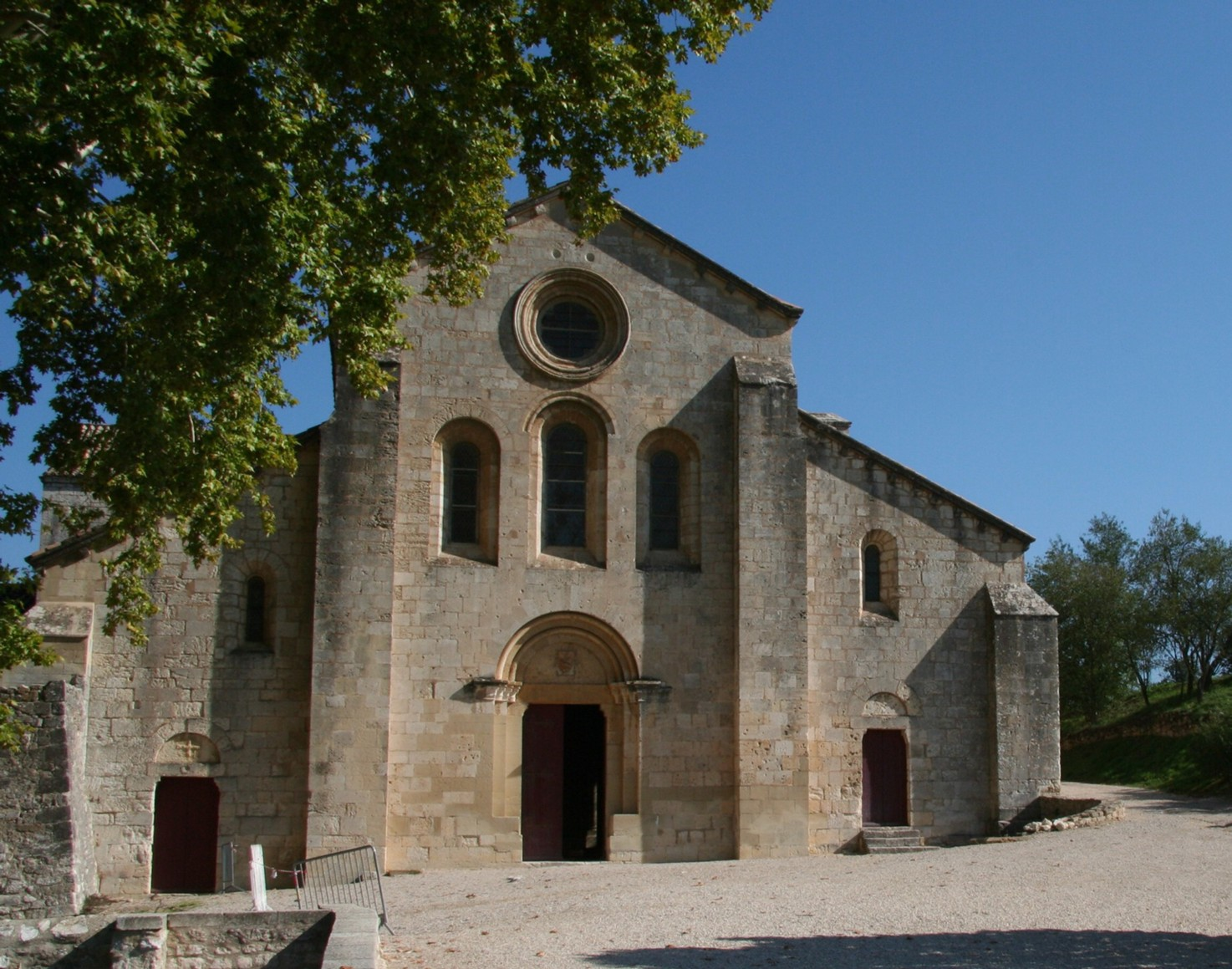
Exterior of the abbey church, Silvacane Abbey

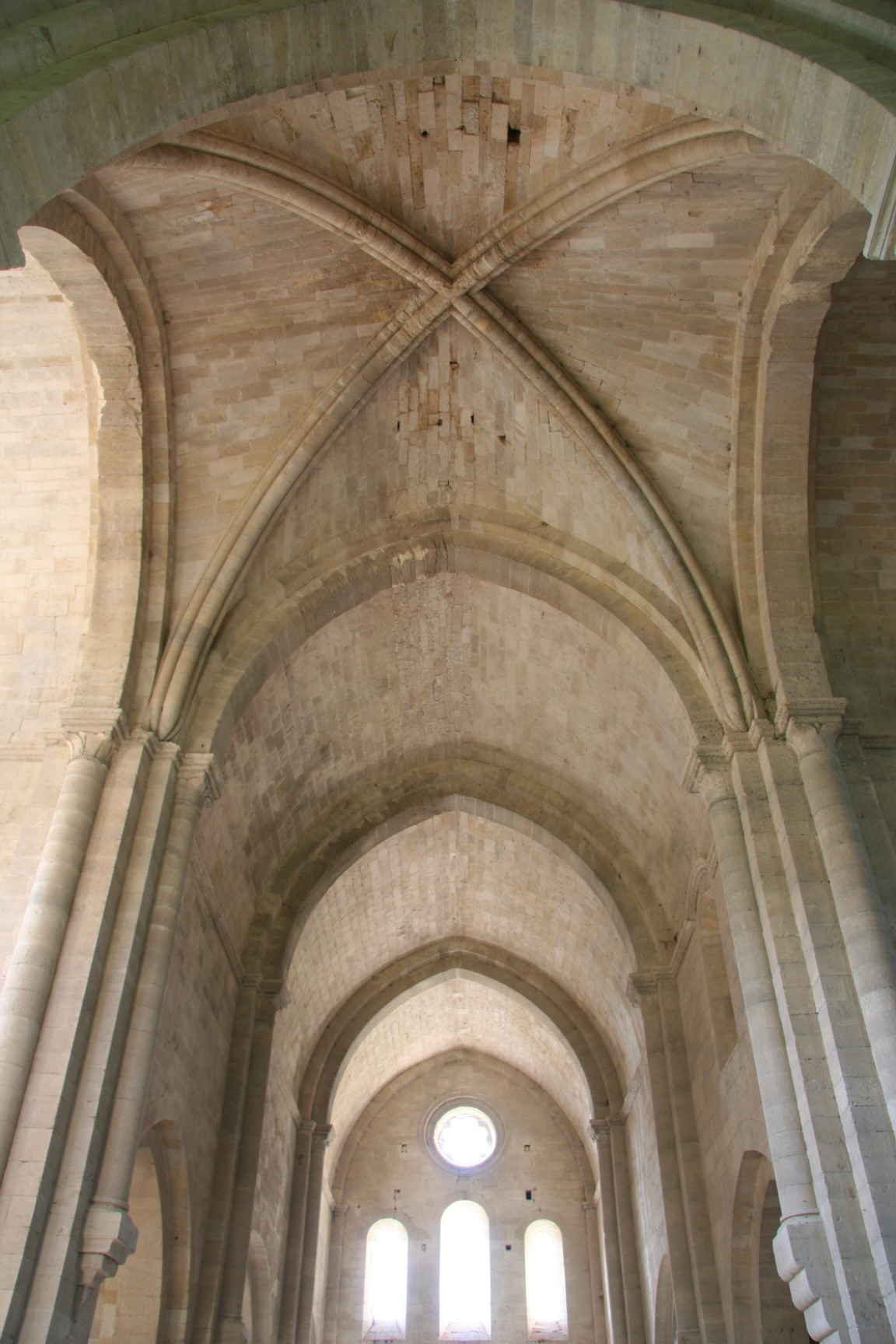
East view, interior of the abbey church (12th-13th century)

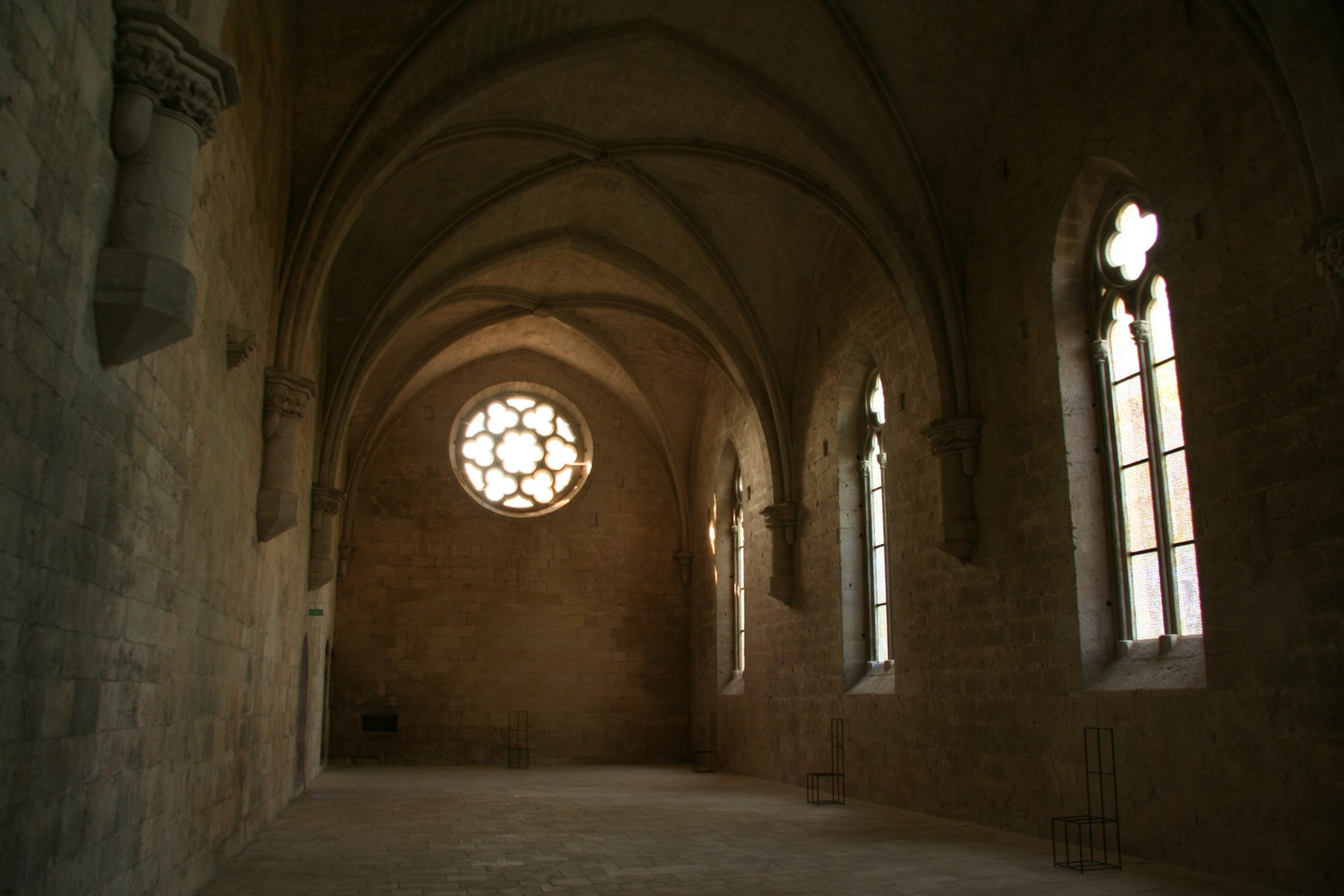
The chapter house (13th century)

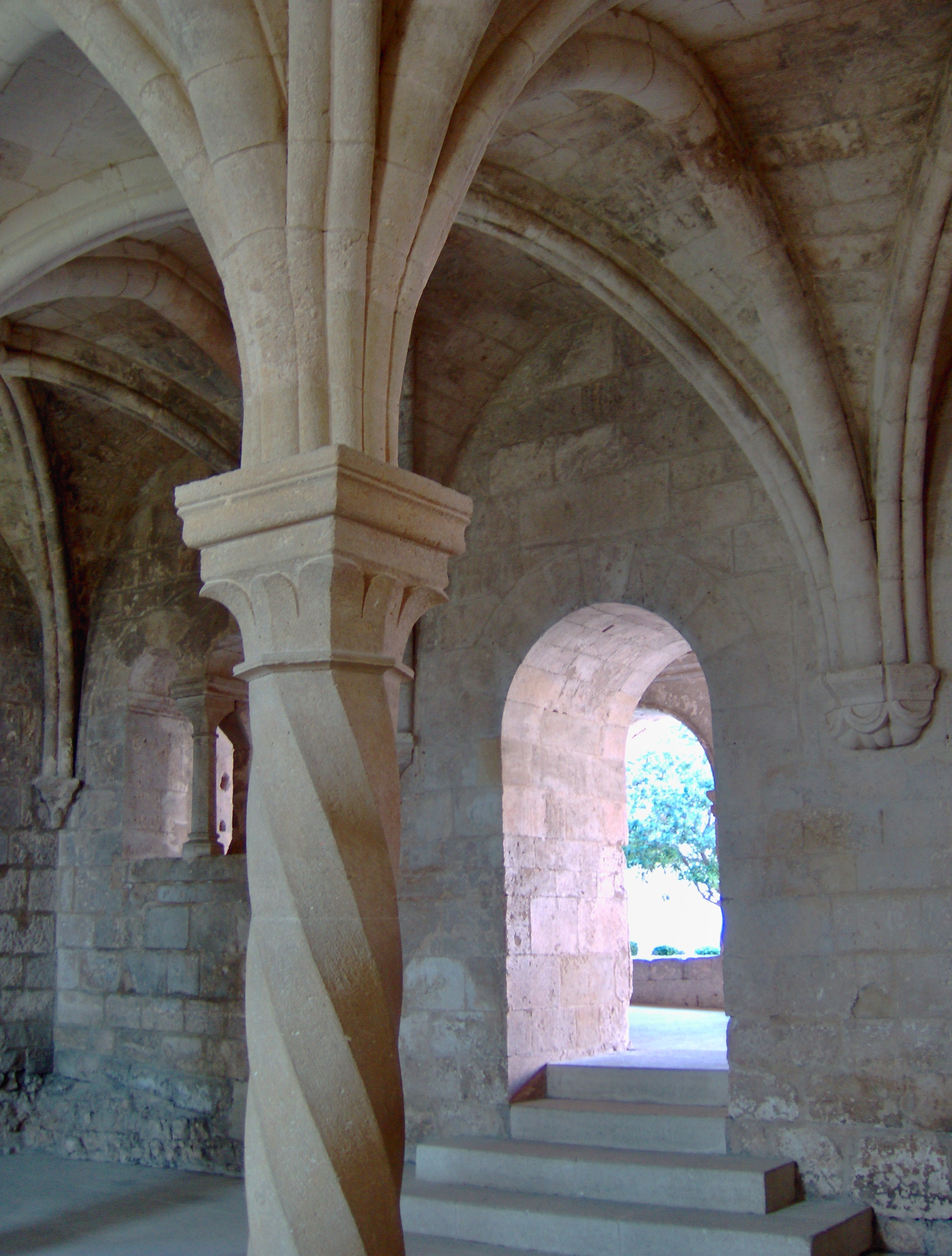
The chapter house

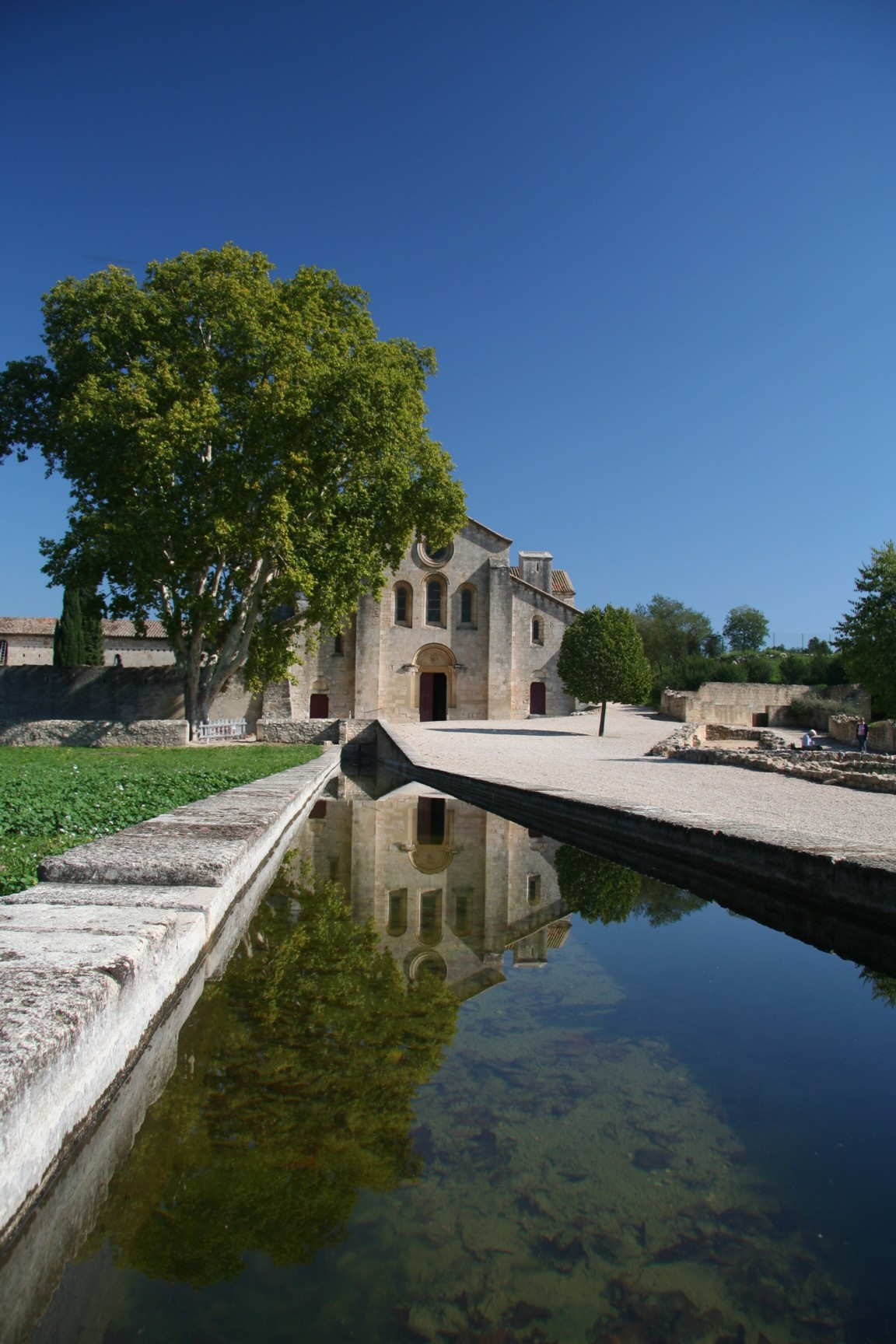
Fish tank (vivier) supplied the monks' table

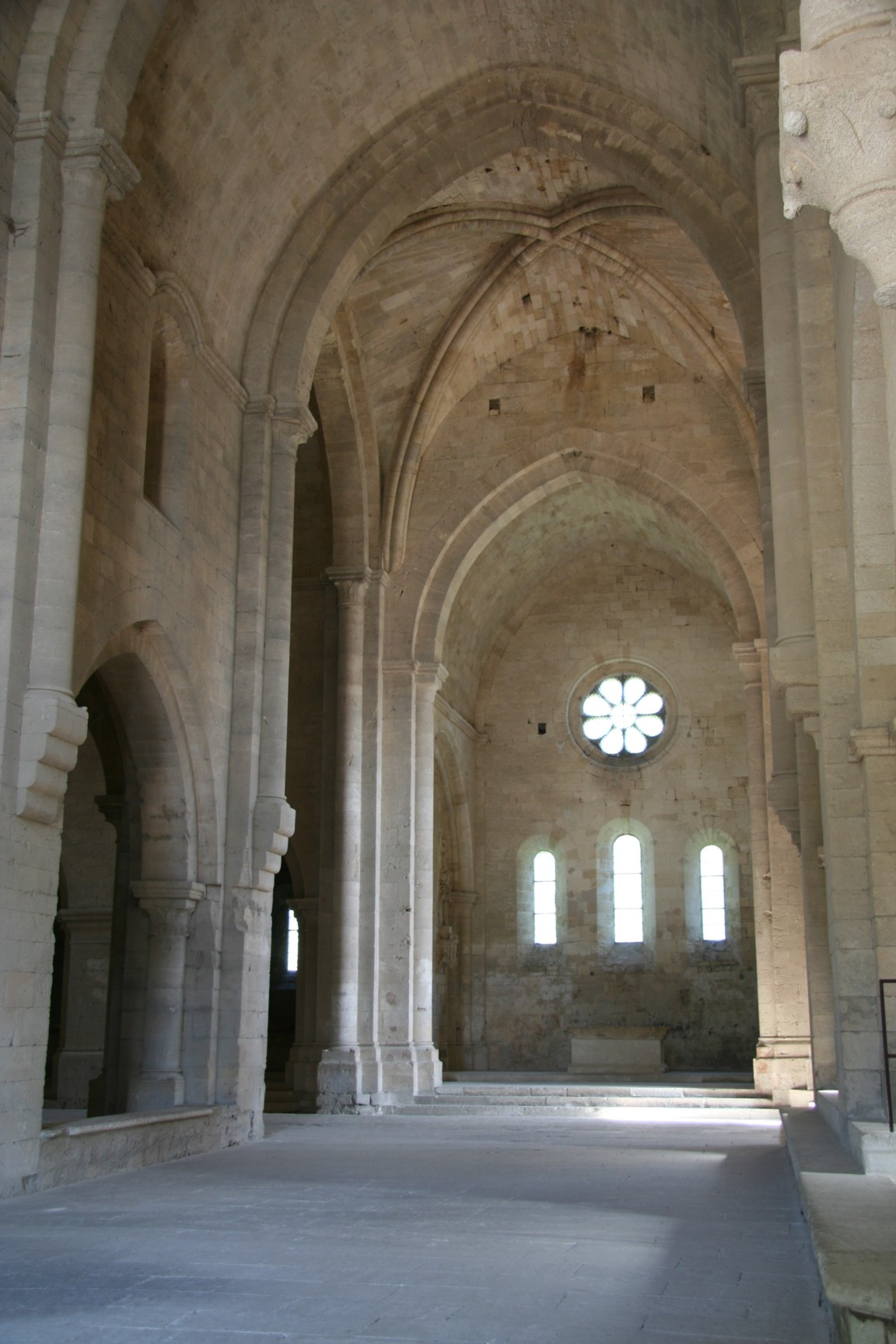
The abbey church (12th-13th centuries)

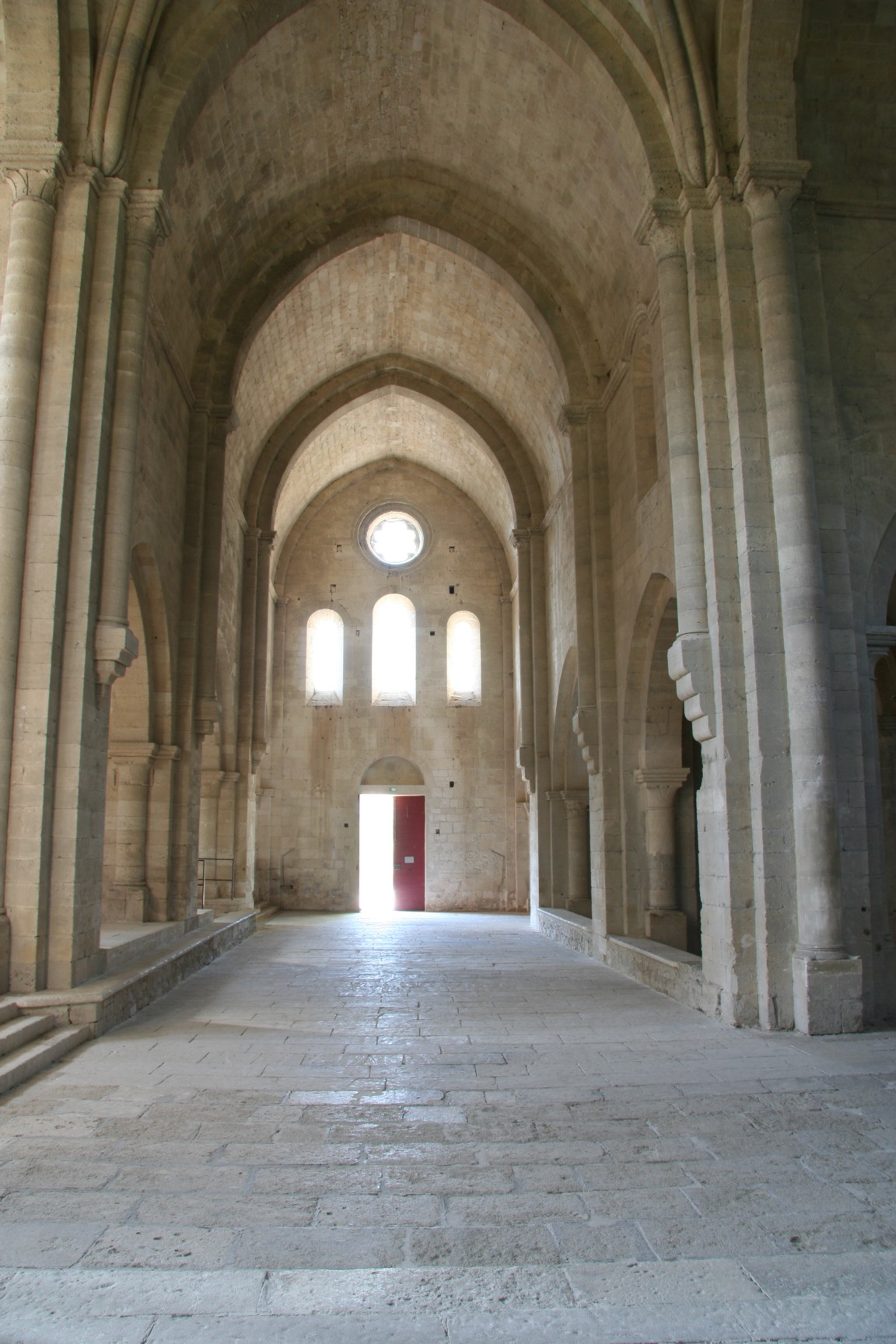
Interior of the church looking west (13th century)

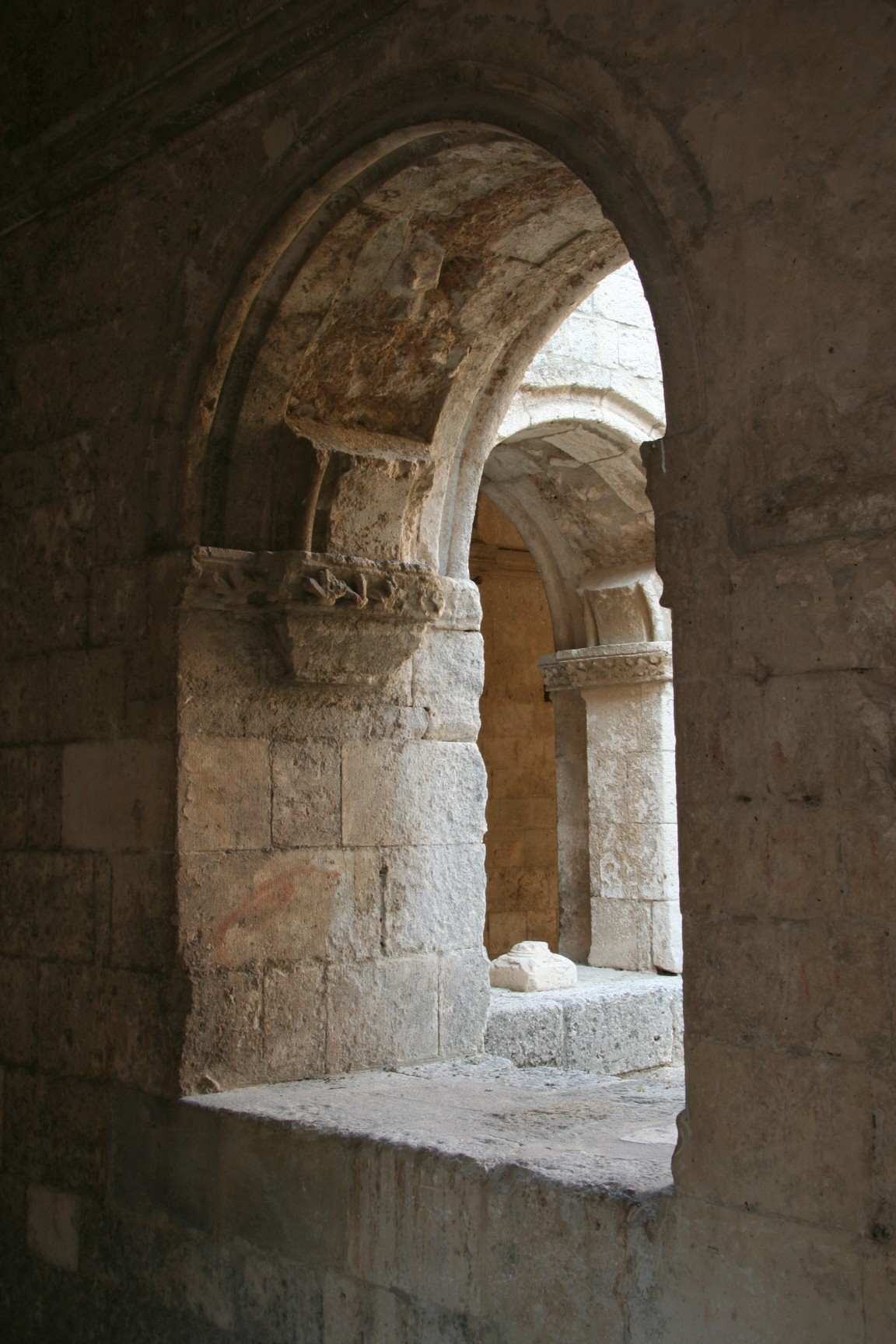
The cloister (13th century)

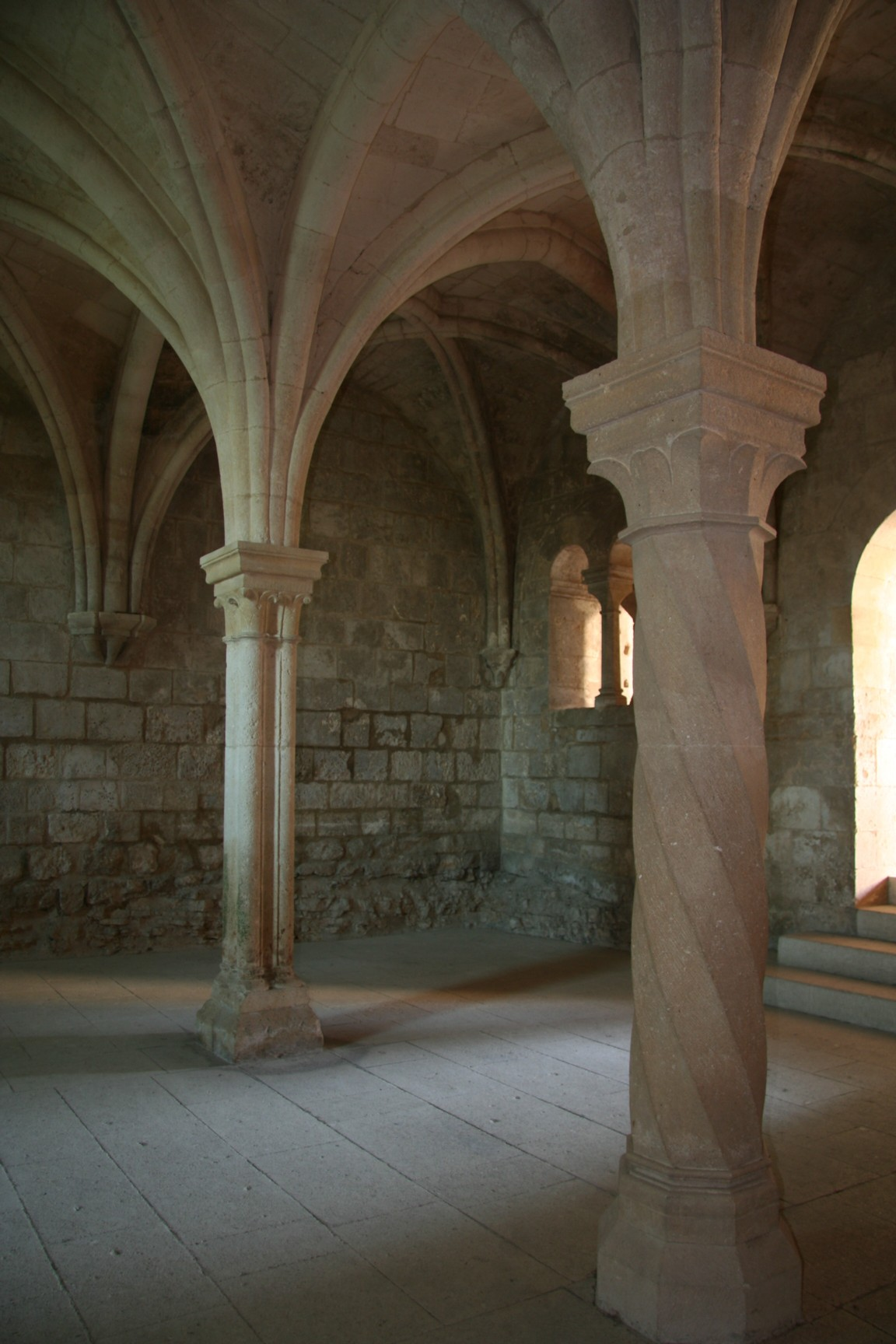
The refectory (13th century)

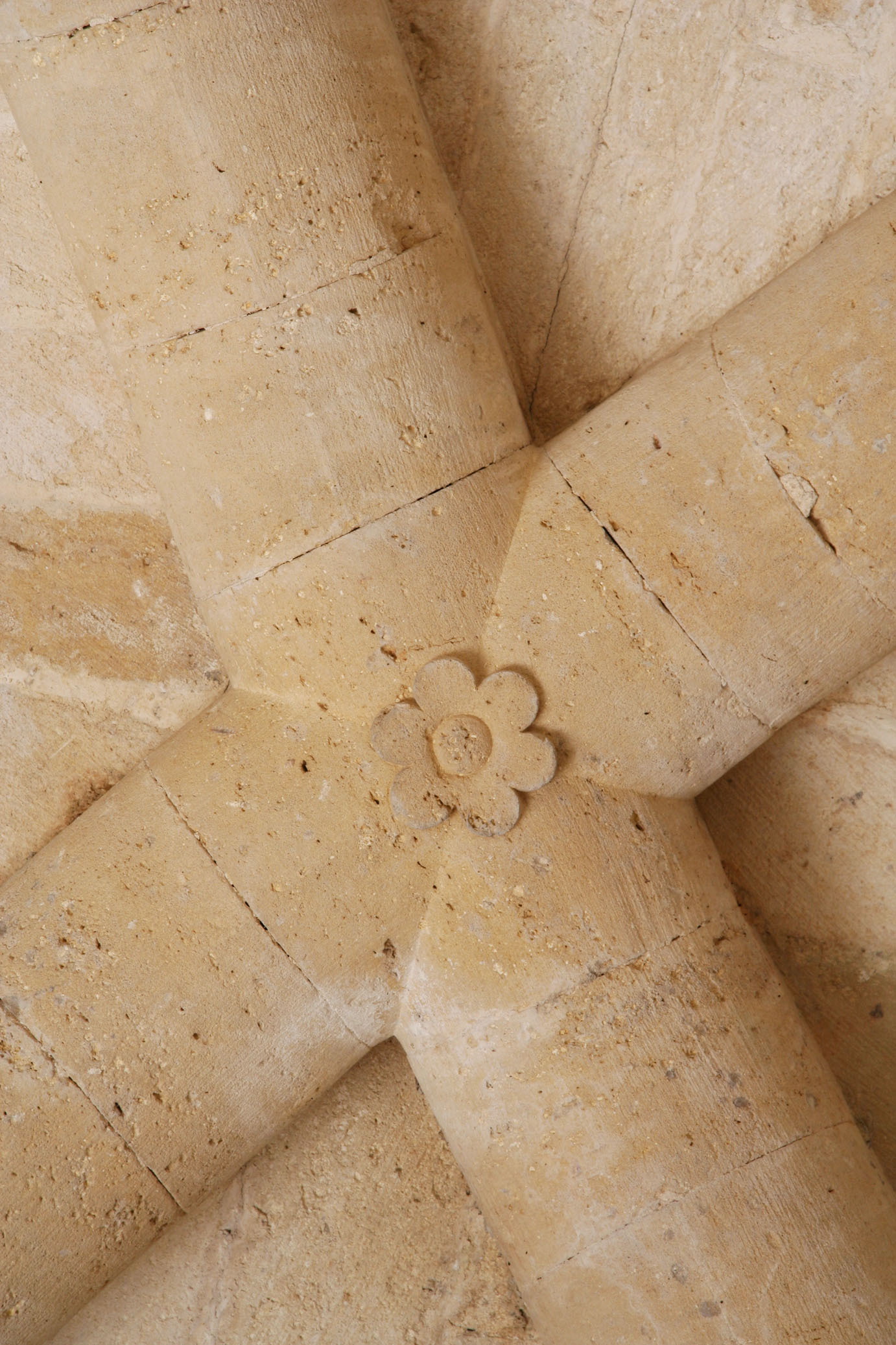
Decoration on a ribbed vault keystone

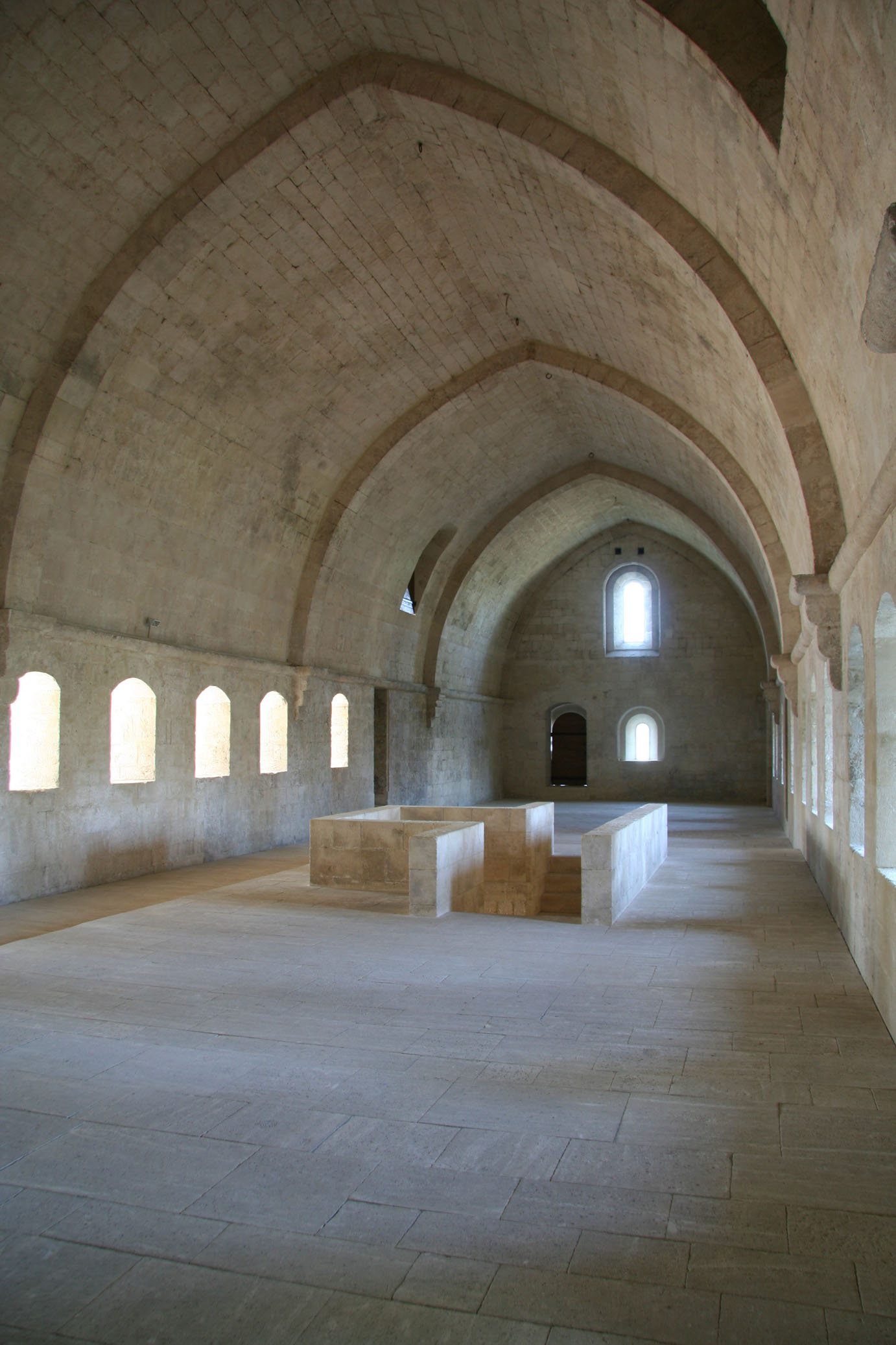
Pointed barrel vault in monks' dormitory

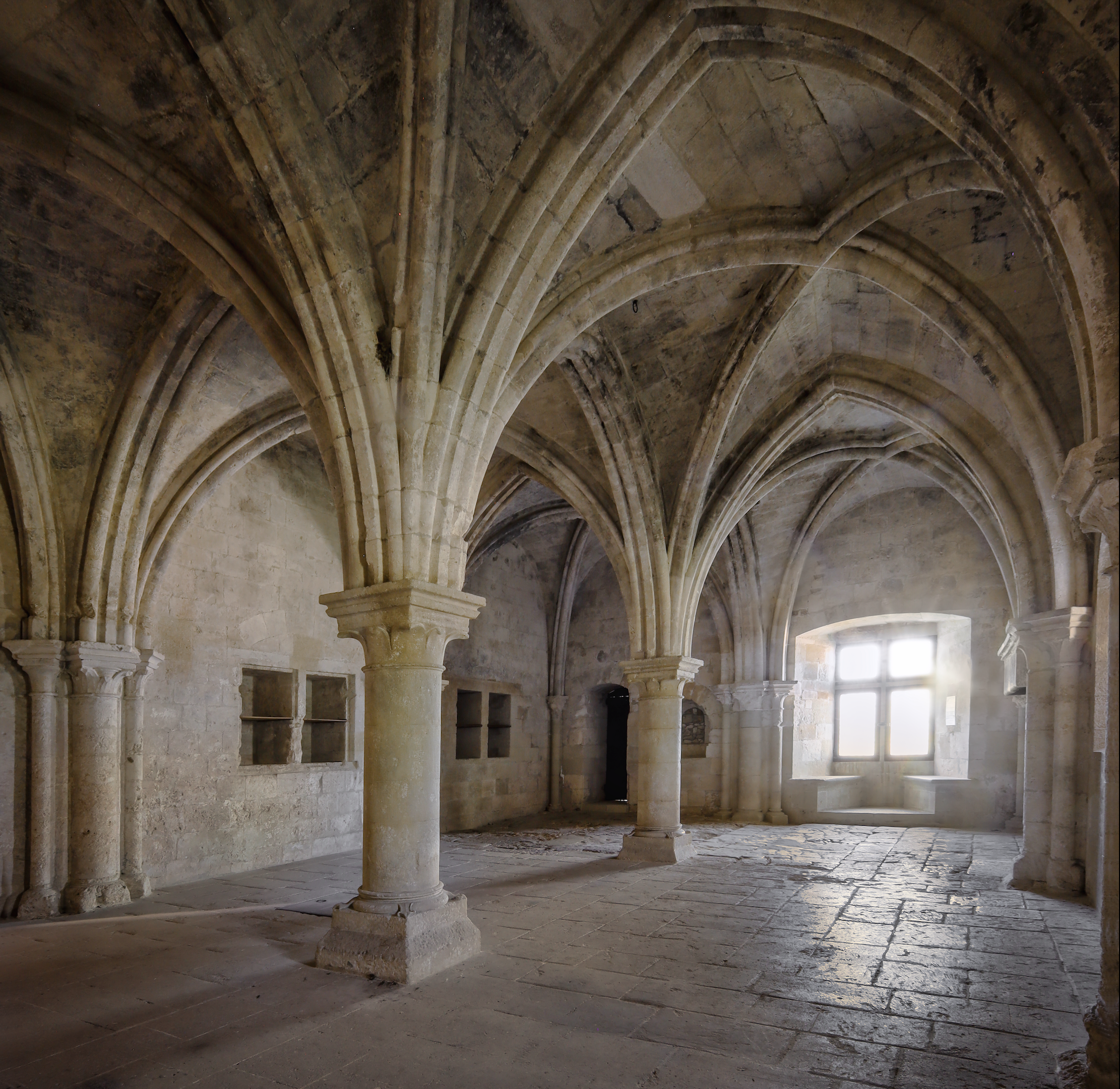
Chapter House

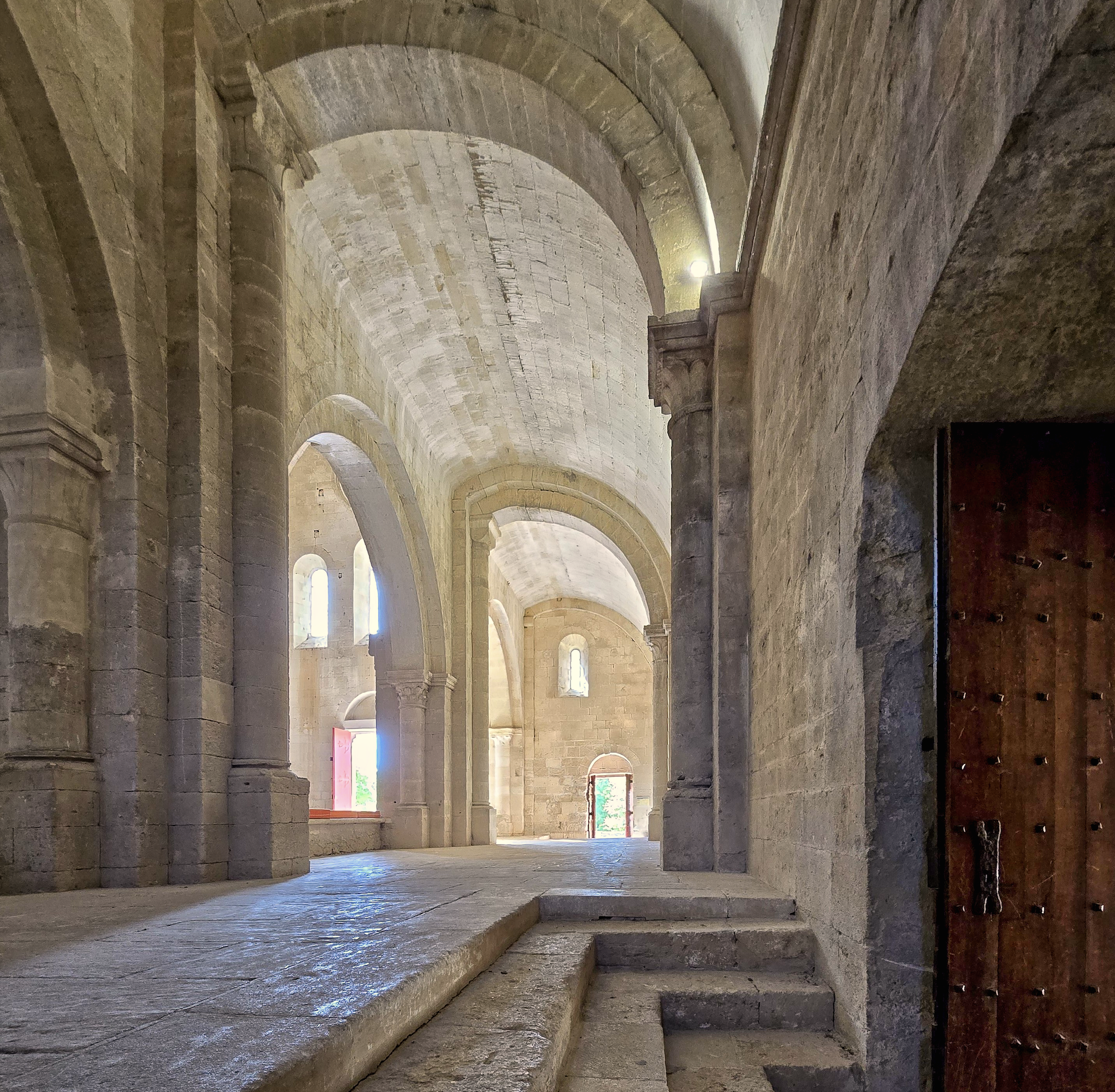
Half barrel vaulted side aisle

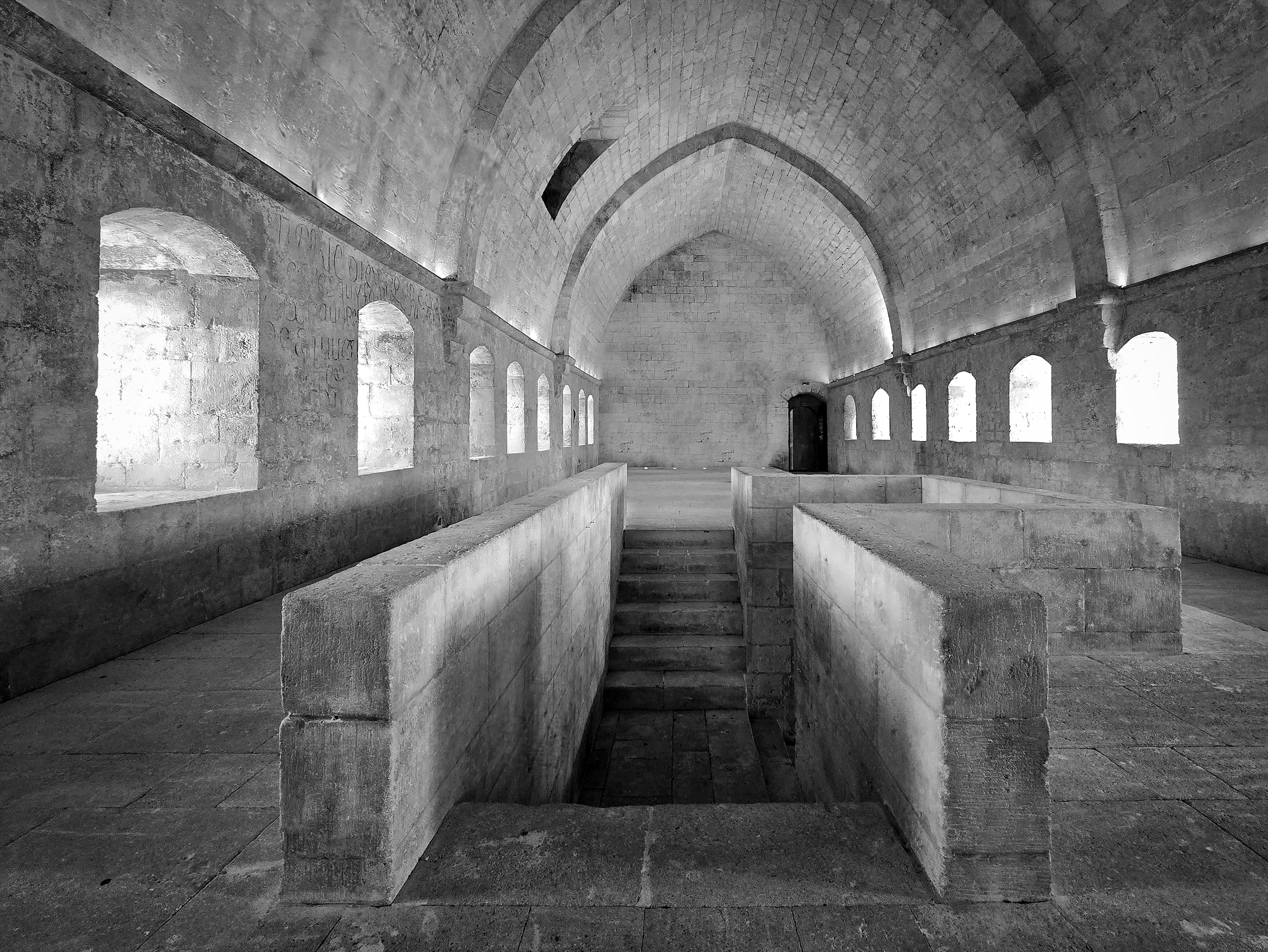
Dormitory

== Sources ==
- Abbayesprovencales.free.fr: Silvacane (in French)
- Abbeys in Provence: Silvacane (in French)
- Monuments nationaux: Silvacane (in English and French)
