= Damien Poisblaud =

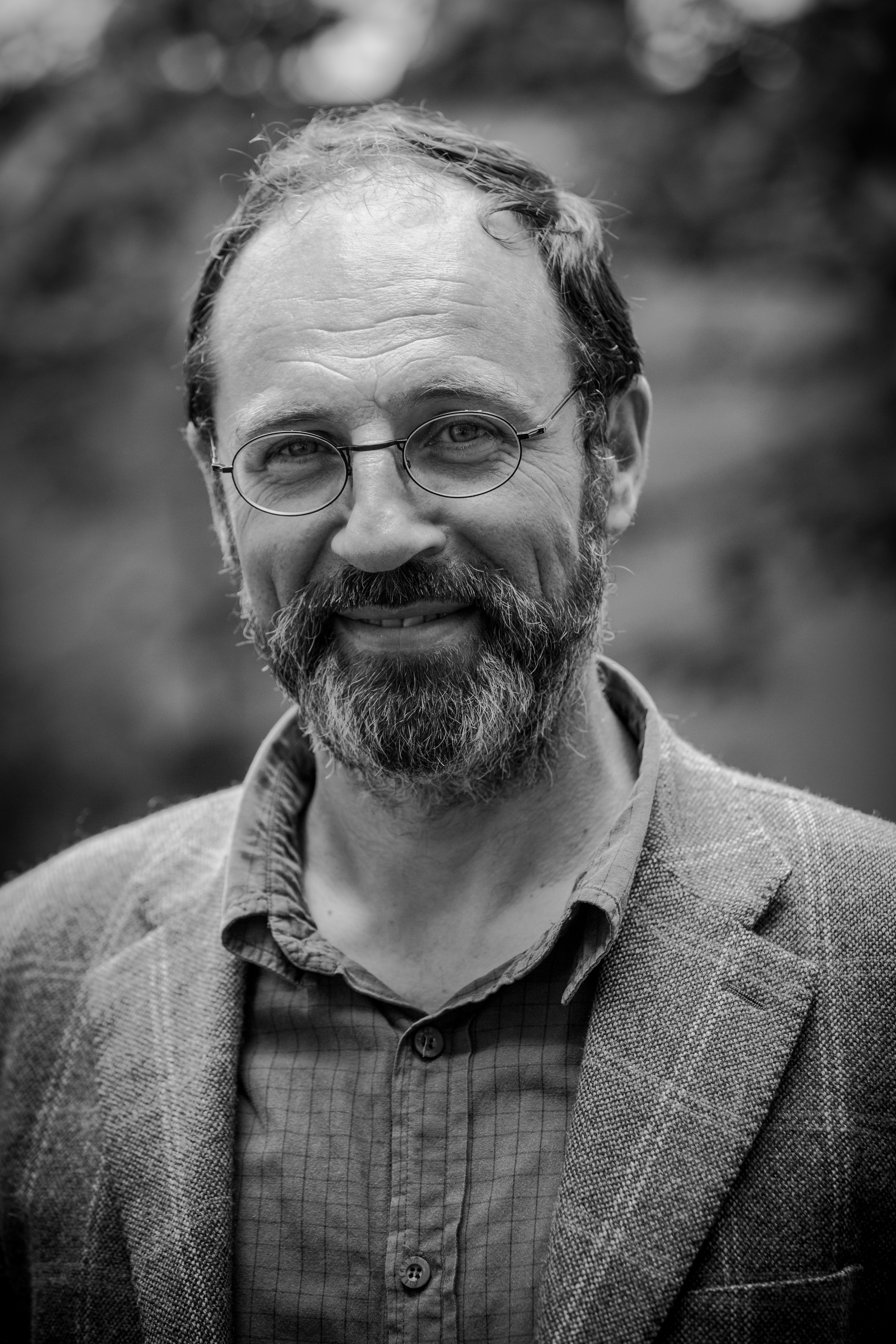
- Damien Poisblaud in May 2014

Background information
- Born: 13 April 1961 (age 65); Maillé, Vendée, France
- Genres: Gregorian chant; Medieval music
- Occupation: Cantor
- Years active: 1989–present

Damien Poisblaud (born 13 April 1961 in Maillé in Vendée) is a French cantor specializing in Gregorian chant. He is the director of the Gregorian choir "Les Chantres du Thoronet".

== Biography ==
Damien Poisblaud took interest in gregorian singing in 1980 which he practiced in a choir for more than fifteen years. Alongside his studies in philosophy, he studied art and thought of the Middle Ages.

In 1989, he made a first recording in Thoronet Abbey. In 1991, he created the "Gregorian Choir of the Mediterranean" with which he recorded a Gregorian Requiem which obtained a Diapason d'or in December 1996.

From 1996, he has been singing with Marcel Pérès and the Ensemble Organum. He subsequently followed the teachings of Marie-Noël Colette at the École pratique des hautes études and that of Jean-Yves Hameline on the anthropology of the ritual gesture.

Since 1999, he has been studying the Byzantine Rite following the Greek and Syrian traditions of Aleppo. With the band Les Paraphonistes which he founded in 1998, he undertook to revisit the repertoire of the church fauxbourdons of the 18th and 19th centuries. He recorded a record of these fauxbourdons of the North of France, a "Solemn Mass of the Dead", which was rewarded by a Diapason d'or in July 2000.

During the year 2000, Damien Poisblaud directed the Codex Calixtinus in several cultural capitals of Europe – Reykjavík, Santiago de Compostela, Kraków, Prague, Helsinki and Bologna – on the occasion of the Festival of the Nine European cities of culture 2000.

Since 2008, he has been singing the Sunday Gregorian Mass at the Thoronet Abbey, at the request of Mgr Dominique Rey, bishop of the Roman Catholic Diocese of Fréjus-Toulon.

Damien Poisblaud is married and the father of three.

== Discography ==
- Chant grégorien, Abbaye du Thoronet, Pavane Record 1990.
- Requiem grégorien, Chœur Grégorien de Méditerranée, Alphée, 1996. Diapason d'Or.
- Messe solennelle des morts, Les Paraphonistes, Abeille musiques/Sisyphe 2000. Diapason d'or.
- Codex calixtinus, Les Paraphonistes et la Philharmonie de Cracovie, « Krakow 2000 ».
- Les grands offertoires grégoriens Aux sources du chant sacré, Les Chantres du Thoronet, Psalmus 2010.
- Les chants de la Passion from medieval manuscripts, Les Chantres du Thoronet, Psalmus 2013.
- Le chant des moines au XIIe siècle, Les Chantres du Thoronet, Psalmus 2014.
- Les grands offertoires 2. Les chantres du Thoronet 2016
