= La Roque-d'Anthéron =

Commune in Provence-Alpes-Côte d'Azur, France

La Roque-d'Anthéron La Ròca d'Antarron (Occitan)
- Commune
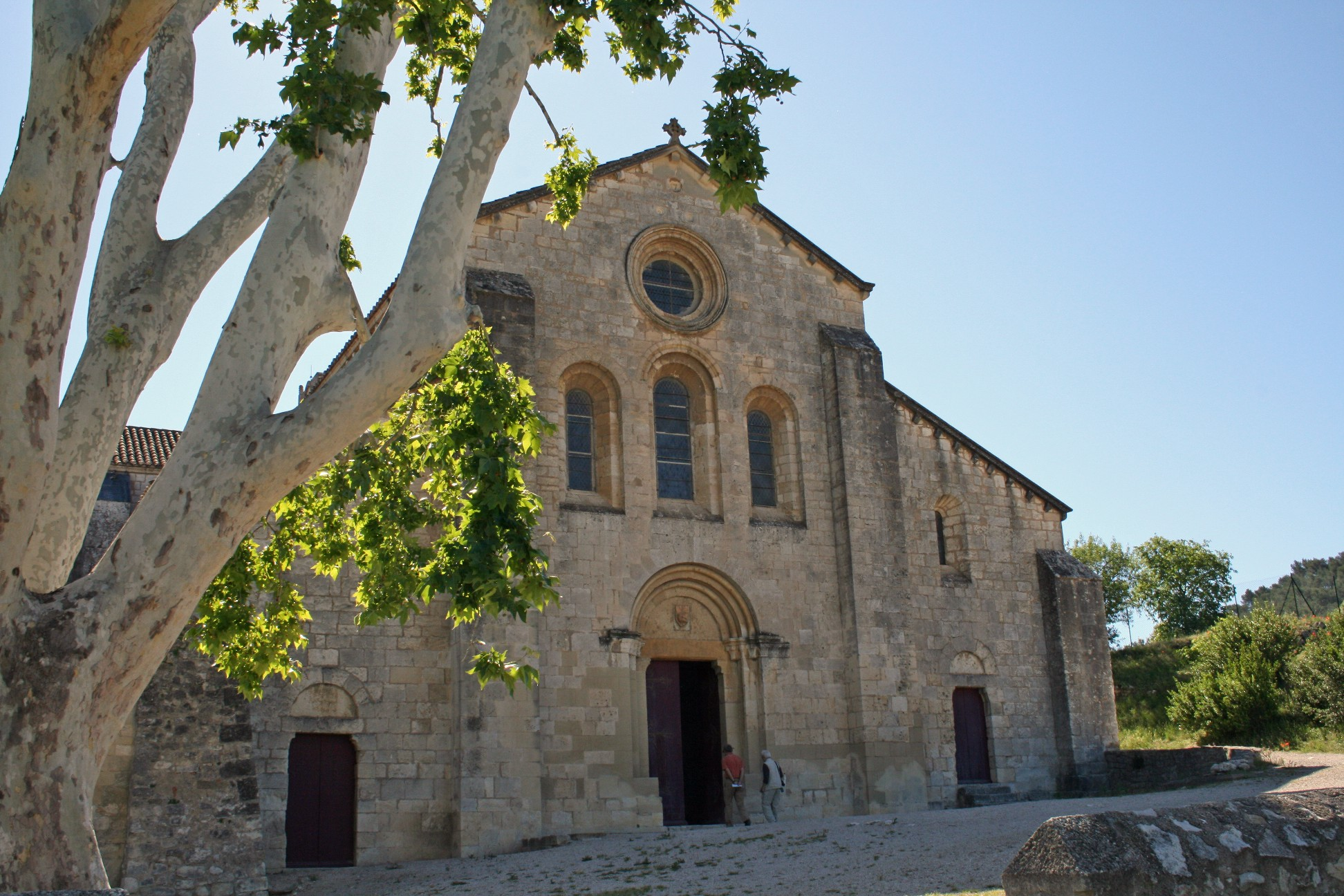
- Silvacane Abbey in La Roque-d'Anthéron

- Coat of arms
- Location of La Roque-d'Anthéron
- Location within France Location within Provence-Alpes-Côte d'Azur
- Coordinates: 43°42′56″N 5°18′41″E
- Country: France
- Region: Provence-Alpes-Côte d'Azur
- Department: Bouches-du-Rhône
- Arrondissement: Aix-en-Provence
- Canton: Pélissanne
- Intercommunality: Aix-Marseille-Provence

Government
  - Mayor (2026–32): Jean-Pierre Serrus (RE)
- Area^{1}: 25.49 km^{2} (9.84 sq mi)
- Elevation: 175 m (574 ft)
- Highest elevation: 484 m (1,588 ft)
- Lowest elevation: 128 m (420 ft)
- Population (2023): 5,459
  - Density: 214.2/km^{2} (554.7/sq mi)
- Demonym: Rocassiers
- Time zone: UTC+01:00 (CET)
  - Summer (DST): UTC+02:00 (CEST)
- INSEE/Postal code: 13084 /13640
- Website: ville-la-roque-d-antheron.fr
- ^{1} French Land Register data, which excludes lakes, ponds, glaciers > 1 km^{2} (0.386 sq mi or 247 acres) and river estuaries.

La Roque-d'Anthéron (French pronunciation: [la ʁɔk dɑ̃teʁɔ̃]; Provençal: La Ròca d'Antarron) is a commune in the Bouches-du-Rhône department in the Provence-Alpes-Côte d'Azur region in Southern France. Part of the Aix-Marseille-Provence Metropolis, it is located on the departmental border with Vaucluse. Silvacane Abbey, a former Cistercian monastery founded in 1144 by monks from Morimond Abbey, is located in La Roque-d'Anthéron, east of the town centre.

== History ==
Cited in 1037 under the name of Roca, the village then had a varying etymology being named La Rocca d'An Tarron (in 1200), Roccha Tarroni (in 1274) and then Rocca d'en Tarron.

== Demographics ==
Historical population

Year	Pop.	±% p.a.
1793	1,228	—
1800	1,319	+1.03%
1806	1,278	−0.52%
1821	1,381	+0.52%
1831	1,506	+0.87%
1836	1,417	−1.21%
1841	1,498	+1.12%
1846	1,544	+0.61%
1851	1,474	−0.92%
1856	1,495	+0.28%
1861	1,584	+1.16%
1866	1,543	−0.52%
1872	1,494	−0.54%
1876	1,603	+1.78%
1881	1,517	−1.10%
1886	1,503	−0.19%
1891	1,428	−1.02%
1896	1,522	+1.28%
1901	1,452	−0.94%

Year	Pop.	±% p.a.
1906	1,555	+1.38%
1911	1,517	−0.49%
1921	1,308	−1.47%
1926	1,277	−0.48%
1931	1,188	−1.43%
1936	1,159	−0.49%
1946	1,121	−0.33%
1954	1,075	−0.52%
1962	1,415	+3.49%
1968	2,282	+8.29%
1975	2,876	+3.36%
1982	3,692	+3.63%
1990	3,923	+0.76%
1999	4,446	+1.40%
2007	5,013	+1.51%
2012	5,390	+1.46%
2017	5,455	+0.24%
2023	5,459	+0.01%

Source: EHESS and INSEE (1968-2023)

== See also ==
- Communes of the Bouches-du-Rhône department
- Festival de La Roque-d'Anthéron
