= Battle of Bouin =

1793 conflict of the War in the Vendée

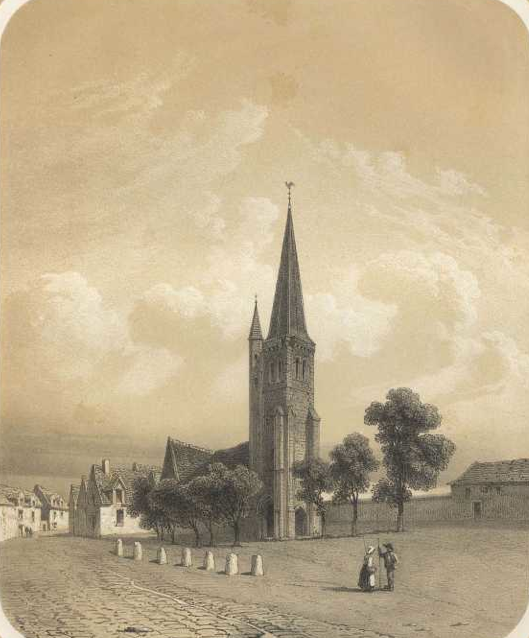
- Tour de Bouin, drawing by Thomas Drake and lithograph by Henri Daniaud, 1860.
| Date | December 6, 1793 |
| Location | Isle of Bouin, Bouin 46°58′28″N 2°00′02″W |
| Result | Republican victory |

Belligerents
| FranceFrench First Republic | Catholic and Royal Armies |

Commanders and leaders
| Nicolas Louis Jordy; Dominique Aubertin | François Athanase Charette de La Contrie; Jean-Baptiste de Couëtus; Louis Guérin |

Strength
| 2,000 to 3,000 people 1 canon | 1,500 to 2,400 men 5 to 13 cannons |

Casualties and losses
| 19 dead 83 wounded | 200 dead 500 wounded 5 to 13 cannons captured |

The Battle of Bouin took place on 6 December 1793 during the War in the Vendée. It occurred on the island of Bouin and opposed Republican troops of the Army of the West to Vendéan forces commanded by François de Charette.

The engagement formed part of a Republican offensive launched in November from Nantes and Les Sables-d'Olonne, with the objective of retaking the island of Noirmoutier, which had been captured by the Vendéans in October. Following several defeats inflicted by the columns of Generals Haxo and Dutruy, Charette attempted to withdraw to Noirmoutier but was unable to do so and became encircled on the island of Bouin.

The assault was launched on the morning of 6 December 1793 by three Republican columns, which breached the Royalist defenses and secured control of the island within a few hours. During the operation, several hundred Patriot prisoners were freed, and the insurgents’ artillery and horses were captured. Despite sustaining significant losses, the forces commanded by François de Charette avoided destruction and withdrew across the marshes. A few days later, they resumed operations in the bocage. On 12 December, Charette was elected generalissimo of the Catholic and Royal Army of Lower Poitou.

== Context ==
=== Beginning of the Republican offensive ===
On 12 October 1793, the Vendéan forces commanded by François de Charette captured the island of Noirmoutier after crossing the submersible Passage du Gois. The small Republican garrison offered limited resistance and subsequently capitulated. Charette established a Royalist administration on the island, left a portion of his troops there, and departed after three days. Republican prisoners were transferred to Bouin, where, on 17 and 18 October, several hundred were killed under the authority of the local Vendéan leader François Pajot.

In Paris, news of the capture of Noirmoutier caused concern within the Committee of Public Safety, which feared that control of the island might enable the Vendéans to obtain support from the British. On 18 October, the executive council received a decree signed by Bertrand Barère, Claude-Antoine Prieur-Duvernois (known as Prieur de la Côte-d’Or), Jean-Marie Collot d'Herbois, Jacques-Nicolas Billaud-Varenne, Maximilien Robespierre, and Marie-Jean Hérault de Séchelles. The decree instructed that “all necessary measures” be taken to attack the island of Noirmoutier as soon as possible, expel the insurgents, and secure it for the Republic.

On 2 November 1793, the war council of the Army of the West instructed Nicolas Haxo, brigadier general, to assemble a force of 5,000 to 6,000 men to retake the island of Noirmoutier. He was ordered to attack and defeat François de Charette “wherever he may be encountered,” pursuing him even onto Noirmoutier if necessary. After preparing a campaign plan, Haxo began operations, dividing his troops into two columns. The first, commanded by Adjutant-General Jordy, departed from Nantes on 21 November. The second, led by Haxo himself, left on 22 November and advanced toward Machecoul, which it occupied on 26 November. Meanwhile, Jordy’s column, numbering approximately 3,000 men, advanced on Port-Saint-Père, which it captured from the forces of La Cathelinière on 26 November after five days of fighting and artillery exchanges. Jordy then proceeded to take Sainte-Pazanne and Bourgneuf-en-Retz before joining General Haxo at Legé on 28 November.

On the opposite side of the insurgent-held territory, Brigadier General Louis Marie Turreau, known as Dutruy, departed from Les Sables-d'Olonne on 21 November. On 22 and 23 November, his forces occupied La Roche-sur-Yon, Aizenay, Le Poiré-sur-Vie, and Palluau, before advancing to Legé. He subsequently joined Haxo at Machecoul.

Meanwhile, François de Charette left his refuge at Touvois and joined his forces with those of Jean-Baptiste Joly and Jean Savin. On 27 November, the combined forces advanced to attack Machecoul, but they were surprised near La Garnache by a column commanded by Lieutenant-Colonel Aubertin, an officer serving under Dutruy. Charette withdrew to Saint-Gervais and then to Beauvoir-sur-Mer, intending to seek refuge on the island of Noirmoutier. This plan was opposed by Joly and Savin, who separated from Charette and returned with their forces to the bocage region. Charette was unable to cross the Passage du Gois to Noirmoutier due to high tide and the arrival of Aubertin’s column. He consequently withdrew to the island of Bouin, where he was soon surrounded. (Note: The enemy continued to advance and, according to observations, seeing that they were preparing to attack us, we went to draw up in battle formation on the plain of Beauvoir. We were, it was said, to withdraw to Noirmoutier; several, frightened by this plan, fled during the night. Messrs. Joly and Savin, who were not of that opinion, took their troops and returned to the Bocage. The two armies remained for a long time facing each other without engaging, but another column having appeared on the road from Châteauneuf, we went back into the Marsh and took the road to Bouin. Monsieur Charette tried to stop the enemy by placing us behind a small ditch: a few cannon shots were enough to dislodge us, and we were pursued as far as L’Epoi. We did not take the road to Noirmoutier because the tide was high. Having taken refuge at Bouin, we were surrounded. — Memoirs of Pierre-Suzanne Lucas de La Championnière.)

=== Retreat of the Vendéans to the islands of Bouin and Noirmoutier ===
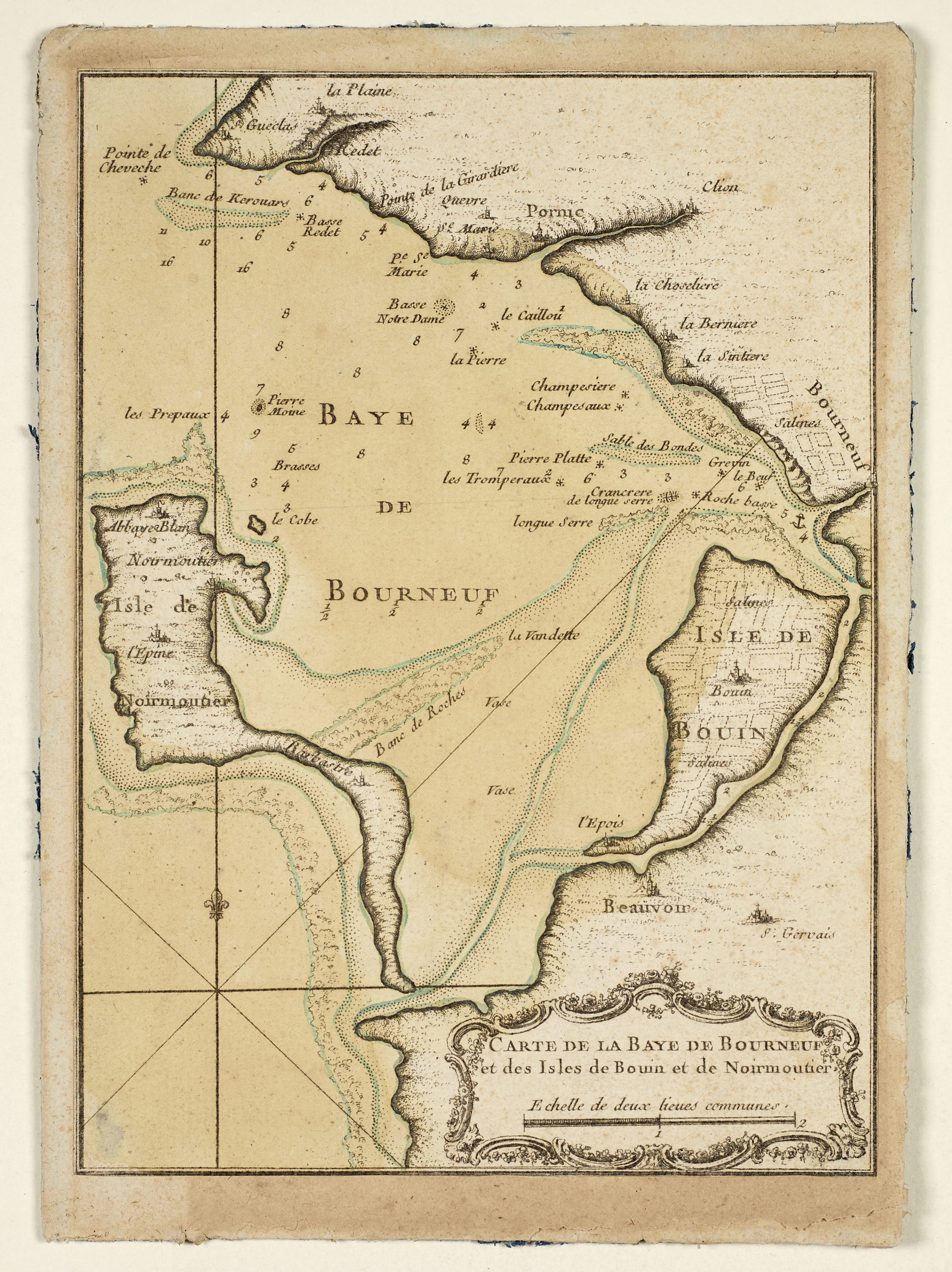
Map of Bourgneuf Bay and the islands of Noirmoutier and Bouin, 1764, Museum of Brittany.

Located in the Bay of Bourgneuf, the island of Bouin had a population of approximately 2,000 to 2,500 inhabitants at the time. It was separated from the mainland by a watercourse known as the Dain, which was heavily silted and could be crossed on foot at low tide. The only bridge providing access to the island was the wooden Claie bridge, connecting the town of Bouin to Bois-de-Céné. The island was traversed by numerous tidal channels, sluices, canals, and dikes. Movement across these ditches was generally facilitated by wooden planks, which Charette had removed in order to impede the advance of Republican forces. The Vendéan troops constructed several entrenchments along the Dain, as well as two or three amphitheater-shaped artillery batteries, including positions at the Jaunay mill and the Pentecôterie mill. They also possessed substantial provisions.

On 1 December, Nicolas Haxo and Louis Marie Turreau (known as Dutruy) were at La Garnache, from where they wrote to the Minister of War: “We are at this moment between Challans and Beauvoir; all posts are occupied; the enemy has only eight leagues of marshland left, where we have surrounded him.” The following day, however, Jean-Antoine Rossignol, commander-in-chief of the Army of the West, ordered Haxo to proceed toward Beaupréau with part of his forces in order to support Generals Desmares and Chabot, who were encountering difficulties against the Angevin insurgents led by La Bouëre and Pierre Cathelineau. Haxo complied with the order and conducted an expedition into the department of Maine-et-Loire for three days.

François de Charette took advantage of this temporary respite to embark by night for the island of Noirmoutier, where his presence is attested on 4 December. He entrusted his aide-de-camp, Joseph Hervouët de La Robrie, with the mission of traveling to England to request assistance. The order was also signed by Maurice d'Elbée, former generalissimo of the Catholic and Royal Army, who had taken refuge on Noirmoutier after being severely wounded at the Battle of Cholet. La Robrie embarked aboard a 60-ton schooner, Le Dauphin, commanded by Louis François Lefebvre. Owing to unfavorable winds or the presence of Republican vessels, however, the ship was unable to depart until the night of 23–24 December. (Note: Le Bouvier-Desmortiers also embarked on Le Dauphin. The expedition was a failure. Le Dauphin reached Great Britain at Fishguard, in Wales, where it was met with stones, then captured and set on fire. Its passengers were imprisoned for several weeks. Joseph de La Robrie nevertheless eventually obtained permission to go to London, but he was not taken seriously by the British government because of his young age — 24 years — and was not recognized as a diplomatic agent. On January 25, 1794, William Windham, the Secretary at War, merely recommended “to provide a few decked boats; and French émigrés with 17 pilots from Noirmoutier will take them with whatever is loaded aboard.” On February 23, his companions were released, but La Robrie received only a letter stating that: “For the moment, one cannot discuss in a precise manner the course to be taken, so long as a port is not in the hands of the Vendéan leaders.” After an unsuccessful attempt in June 1794, Joseph de La Robrie was unable to return to France until February 1795, only to drown in the Bay of Bourgneuf.)

Charette returned to Bouin during the night of 4–5 December. Finding his troops short of ammunition, he ordered Hyacinthe Hervouët de La Robrie, Joseph’s brother, to sail to Noirmoutier to obtain supplies. On his return, however, access to Bouin was blocked by Republican forces, which had meanwhile resumed their offensive.

=== Prelude ===
On 3 December, after searching the forest of Princé the previous day, the column of Adjutant-General Jordy reached Bois-de-Céné and Châteauneuf. The column then divided to begin the encirclement of the island: Jordy remained at Bois-de-Céné, while Adjutant-General Villemin advanced to Bourgneuf-en-Retz. General Dutruy occupied Beauvoir-sur-Mer, and General Haxo reached Challans on 5 December. During the night of 5–6 December, at midnight, orders were issued for the three Republican columns to advance and attack Bouin, with the column from Beauvoir departing at daybreak.

Although the Vendéans were aware of the presence of Republican forces, they spent the night before the battle engaging in feasting and dancing. The royalist officer Pierre-Suzanne Lucas de La Championnière recorded this in his memoirs: “Refugees in Bouin, we were surrounded on all sides: the night was not calm. However, as provisions were plentiful and many women had taken refuge on the Island, some began to dance, others to drink; the least resolute slipped away during the night.”

== Forces ==
=== Vendéan Army ===
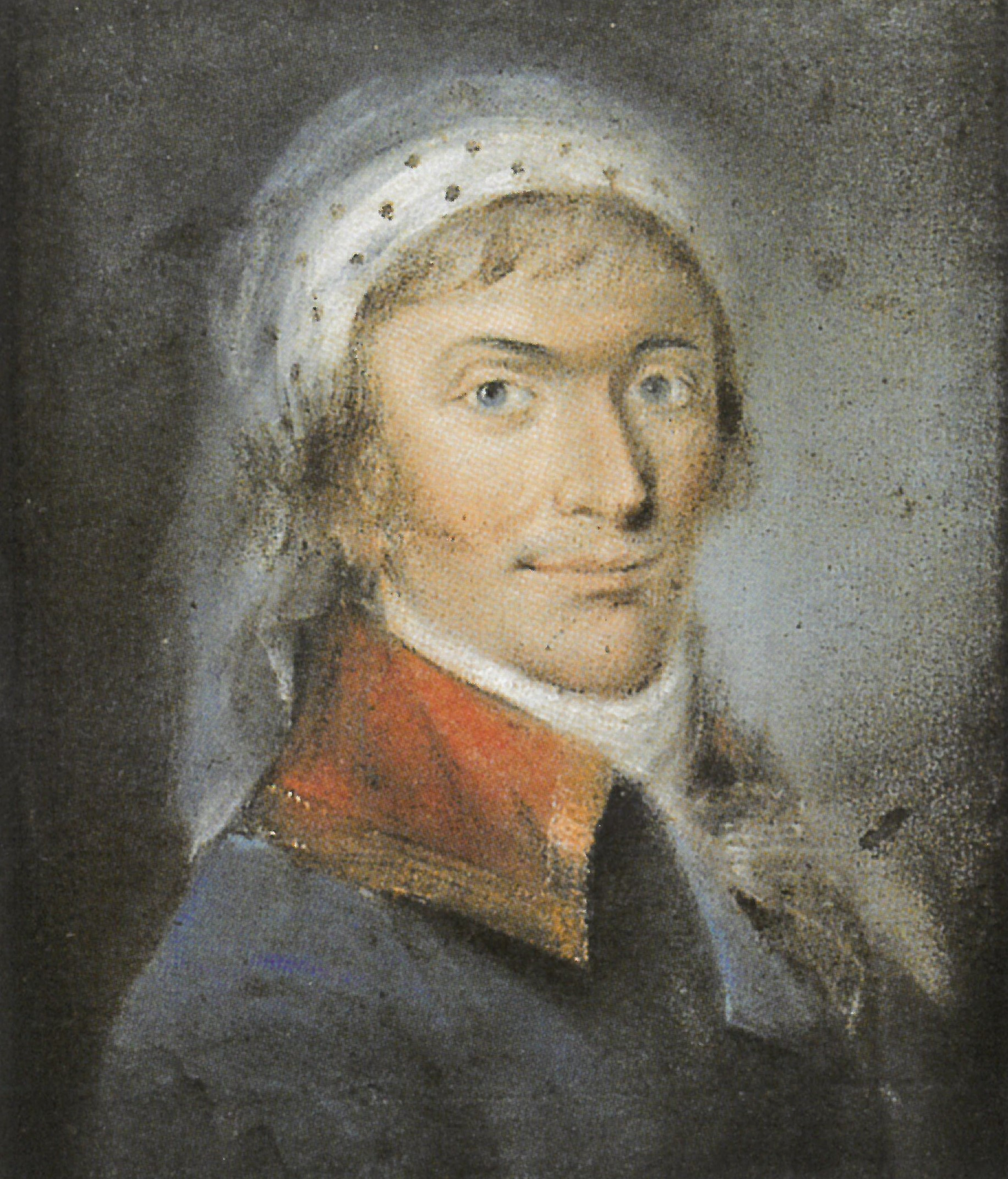
Portrait of François Athanase Charette de La Contrie, anonymous pastel, between 1793 and 1796.

The strength of the Vendéan forces is estimated between 1,500 and 2,400 men, depending on the source. Adjutant-General Jordy estimated it at 1,800, while General Bard, in a letter dated 14 December to General Duval, placed it at 2,400. An anonymous military administrator’s memoirs mention 1,500 combatants. The royalist author Bittard des Portes reports the same figure, whereas Pierre-François Mourain, vice-president of the district of Les Sables-d’Olonne, gives 2,500. Le Bouvier-Desmortiers cites 3,000 Vendéens facing 6,500 Republican troops, though historian Lionel Dumarcet considers these figures likely to be overestimated.

At the northern end of the island of Bouin, a road known as the “southern passage,” leading toward Bourgneuf-en-Retz, was defended by approximately 250 men under Louis Guérin, reportedly positioned at Les Corbets. To the east, Jean-Baptiste de Couëtus commanded around 400 men guarding the road to Bois-de-Céné and holding the redoubt of the Jaunay mill, located south of the Claie bridge. Charette deployed the main body of forces at the village of L’Epois to the south, along the road to Beauvoir-sur-Mer, occupying positions at the Poirocq bridge and the La Pentecôterie mill. Additional forces were held in reserve within the town of Bouin. François Pajot, commander of the Bouin division, was also present, although contemporary accounts do not detail his role during the engagement.

=== Republican Army ===
The Republican forces mobilized approximately 5,000 men for the operation, although not all participated directly in the combat. (Note: According to Aubertin, Haxo’s brigade formed about 5,000 men, “including the garrisons or stationary detachments, and the men in hospitals.” According to the memoirs of the military administrator, 2,000 infantrymen took part in the assault; according to the historian Yves Gras, 3,000. According to Aubertin, only the 2,200 men of his column and that of Jordy participated in the fighting.) These forces were organized into three columns. (Note: According to the memoirs of the military administrator, later taken up by several authors, some of these columns were commanded by Adjutant-Generals Dufour and Guillemet. According to Simone Loidreau, there was no adjutant-general named Guillemet in Vendée in December 1793. The military administrator also mentions three other columns kept in the rear, totaling 1,800 men and commanded by Adjutant-Generals Sainte-Suzanne, Chadeau, and Mangin, tasked with intercepting any Vendéan retreat between Bouin and Machecoul.) To the north of Bouin, the column led by Adjutant-General Villemin positioned itself at Bourgneuf-en-Retz. To the east, the column under Adjutant-General Nicolas Louis Jordy advanced along the road to Bois-de-Céné. To the south, the column commanded by Lieutenant-Colonel Aubertin approached via the road from Beauvoir-sur-Mer. Artillery was deployed only with the northern and southern columns. Gunboats patrolled the surrounding waters to prevent any potential escape by sea.

Jordy’s column is estimated to have numbered between 674 and 2,500 people. (Note: In his account, Jordy writes that his column numbered 674 men. Lieutenant-Colonel Aubertin, for his part, states that his column was of the same strength as Jordy’s and that together they formed about 2,200 men. The Vendéan officer Lucas de La Championnière states that Jordy’s column, which he calls the “Châteauneuf column,” was the weakest and was not feared “because of its insignificance.”) At its center was the 10th Battalion of Volunteers of the Meurthe, commanded by his brother and composed of troops formerly from the Army of Mainz. This battalion was supported by a detachment from the 109th Infantry Regiment. The left flank was held by a detachment from the 77th Infantry Regiment, and the right flank by a detachment from the 57th Infantry Regiment.

Aubertin’s column, estimated at 1,000 to 1,100 people with one cannon, included 455 people from the 11th Battalion of Volunteers of the Orléans formation, detachments from the 109th and 110th Infantry Regiments, several other units, and artillery personnel from the 1st Battalion of the Bas-Rhin.

== Course of events ==
=== Sources ===
The course of the fighting is documented in several letters and reports by General Haxo, General Vimeux, and the Committee of Public Safety. Accounts from participants are limited: Adjutant-General Jordy, (Note: On December 3, I directed my troop in two columns, one by Châteauneuf and the other by Bois-de-Céné. I then sent forward two detachments, one on my right by Bourgneuf, and the other on my left by Beauvoir, while I held the center with a column. On the 6th, at midnight, I gave the order to the three columns to advance and to direct their march so that at eleven o’clock in the morning each would be present and before Bouin. The two flanking columns, which alone had cannon, were halted by marshes and could not arrive at the indicated hour. However, the center column, numbering only six hundred and seventy-four men, arrived under the cannon of the Bouin batteries after crossing a multitude of half-frozen ditches. My position was becoming worrisome, but we were too far advanced to withdraw. The enemy had three batteries in amphitheater formation on the height of the mills. A republican stroke was the only course to take. I sent the 57th Battalion to my right, the 77th to my left, kept the 10th of the Meurthe in the center, and finally placed a detachment of the 109th in second line. All being thus arranged, I ordered the 57th and 77th to move along the enemy’s flanks, and the 10th of the Meurthe to advance with the bayonet fixed to the musket, to withstand the first discharge without firing, and then to charge with the greatest speed. The two flanking battalions had received the same order. The enemy, 1,800 strong, with Charette and Guérin at its head, at first made a stubborn resistance; but the 10th of the Meurthe, having broken the center, seized the first entrenchment and the enemy was overthrown. The two flanking battalions arrived at that moment; the two entrenchments that remained to the enemy were attacked and carried. Nothing could resist my brave brothers-in-arms, who pursued the fugitives so closely that the cannon taken from the enemy became useless. About eight hundred Vendéens found their salvation in flight. Charette himself was forced to escape on foot, as was Guérin. The most precious fruit of our victory was the liberation of more than nine hundred patriot prisoners who had expected to perish. Besides that, we captured thirteen pieces of cannon. It is true that we had to regret nineteen of our comrades left on the field of battle and eighty-three wounded, eight of them seriously. We were then masters of the entire coast, and I was to move on Noirmoutier; but on the 8th I received the order to detach four battalions from my column to go and cover Nantes. I was therefore obliged to remain inactive until the 30th, when these battalions were returned to me. — Historical summary of my civil and military actions, by Jordy) Lieutenant-Colonel Aubertin, (Note: On December 6, at daybreak, the third column set out from Beauvoir, followed by the twenty wagons loaded with materials. The sappers managed to restore, fairly solidly, the destroyed bridges, under the fire of a sixteen-pounder mounted on a naval carriage, placed in a coastal battery, and which the Vendéens had turned against their adversaries. The troop likewise remained exposed to this fire until it became possible, through the restoration of the bridge that was level with it, to seize it. After the restoration of seven to eight bridges, the column arrived half a league from the island. There was a farm between the troop and the sea, and at the foot of a windmill situated nearby, the Vendéens had raised a kind of redoubt, with two embrasures fitted with cannons which began to fire as soon as the republicans came into view. The entrenchment appeared to be guarded by numerous posts. The nature of the terrain, on either side of the road, invincibly opposed any maneuver capable of shielding the troop from the very heavy fire of the enemy artillery. Therefore, without stopping to reply with the single piece he had with him, Aubertin led his column, at the most accelerated charge step, directly against the redoubt; some soldiers entered through the embrasures, while others forced the gorge; the Vendéens took flight, abandoning two four-pounders with their caissons, and leaving several dead and wounded on the field. Jordy’s column arrived at the same time, at the indicated point, and entered shortly afterward the town of Bouin, where it seized seventy horses, after a slight engagement with the troop of Guérin, one of Charette’s lieutenants. The two republican columns were thus marching in a great curved line, opposite one another; the column of Adjutant-General Villemin, had it effected its crossing, would have covered the stretch of ground on the island between the sea and Jordy’s troop; and the latter would have been supported. In the critical position in which Charette then found himself, two means of salvation presented themselves to him: the first was to march frankly and vigorously against Aubertin’s column, to carry out his retreat by forcing a passage through those troops to the island of Noirmoutier, which is only about a league and a half distant from that of Bouin and which can be reached by a channel likewise fordable at low tide; the second (while avoiding Jordy’s column, or even, if necessary, seeking to overthrow it) was to throw himself into the marshes to reach Bois-de-Céné. The Vendéan leader chose the latter course. He abandoned his horses, his artillery, his baggage, and crossed the marshes. The inhabitants of the country acquire the habit, from childhood, of crossing the ditches and bogs of the marshes with the aid of long poles, which they call drimples. It was in this manner that the approximately twelve hundred Vendéens who composed Charette’s troop found the means of escaping destruction. — Memoirs of Adjutant-General Aubertin) and the Vendéan leader Pierre-Suzanne Lucas de La Championnière (Note: The republicans advanced from three sides onto the Island of Bouin; the attack began very early in the morning. Monsieur Charette was opposed to the column coming from L’Epoi, which seemed the most formidable, his artillery and his cavalry, which had been dismounted. We fought for a long time with cannon fire: several times on both sides there had been a feint of charging, when suddenly the column coming from Châteauneuf, which was not feared because of its slight appearance, broke through the small number of soldiers who had been placed on that side: we found ourselves caught between two fires with no other retreat than the sea. Monsieur Charette proposed to cut our way through, bayonet in front: we prepared to do so with cries of despair when a local inhabitant, crossing several ditches with a long stick, showed the army a path for retreat. We followed him and, by leaping an infinite number of ditches, managed to get out of the Marsh: all the women remained in the enemy’s power. We likewise abandoned several pieces of cannon, our munitions, and all our horses. — Memoirs of Pierre-Suzanne Lucas de La Championnière) provided descriptions of the events in their memoirs. Additionally, the royalist Urbain-René-Thomas Le Bouvier-Desmortiers left an account; he had taken refuge at Bouin in November, where he may have encountered Charette, but was at Noirmoutier during the battle.

=== Capture of the entrenchments and redoubts by the Republicans ===
Map of the Battle of Bouin, December 6, 1793. 21st-century topography.

According to the planned operation, the three Republican columns were scheduled to converge below Bouin at 11:00 a.m. However, at the designated time, only Jordy’s column had arrived. In the north, Villemin’s column was delayed by the marshes and a shortage of boats and did not participate in the fighting. In the south, Aubertin’s column was also slowed by canals measuring 15 to 18 feet wide and 4 feet deep. All bridges were found to have been cut, requiring reconstruction by a company of sappers from Loire-Inférieure under the engineer officer Fachot, which involved transporting twenty wagons loaded with wood and other materials.

The engagement began with artillery exchanges. Prior to the battle, Charette addressed his troops, urging those unwilling to fight to withdraw and assuring that he would protect those who remained to follow him. (Note: According to a letter from General Bard addressed on December 14, 1793 (24 Frimaire, Year II) to General Duval, Charette proposed to his men “to return home if they wished, that they were fighting at present only for their lives, but that those who wished to follow him had only to show themselves and that he pledged himself to force a passage.” He ordered the cavalry to leave their horses and left his own six as well, seeing our army arrive in three columns. The anonymous memoirs of the military administrator attribute to Charette the following speech: “My comrades, I will not conceal from you the danger that threatens us; but if it is great, your courage is no less so. However, if there are among you any who despair of the public cause, let them go to my left, I do not wish to lead them into combat; but those, on the contrary, who have confidence in their general’s resources, let them spring to my right, I will save them all.” According to the administrator: “His harangue was covered with acclamations, and all swore to follow him.”)

According to Aubertin’s memoirs, after a bridge was restored by the sappers, his column captured an initial battery consisting of a 16-pounder cannon mounted on a naval carriage. The column then rebuilt seven or eight additional bridges and engaged Charette’s forces approximately half a league from Bouin. The Republicans encountered a fortified position with two cannon embrasures and a trench defended by a substantial post, situated at the base of a windmill near the coast. The position was taken by assault, resulting in the Vendéens abandoning two 4-pounder cannons and leaving several dead and wounded.

Jordy, after crossing multiple partially frozen ditches, came under fire from the Jaunay battery but proceeded with the assault. His troops crossed the Dain and the Claie bridge with minimal resistance, overcame the Vendéan entrenchments using bayonet charges, and captured a cannon with the 10th Battalion of the Meurthe. Guérin’s forces retreated toward the town, while Couëtus’s troops were pushed back onto Charette’s main body.

In his memoirs, the Vendéan leader Pierre-Suzanne Lucas de La Championnière provides a brief description of the engagement, noting that “we fought for a long time with cannon fire: several times on both sides we appeared to prepare for a charge, when the column advancing from Châteauneuf, which we had not considered threatening due to its small size, broke through the limited number of soldiers stationed on that side, placing us between two lines of fire.”

=== Retreat of the Vendéens ===
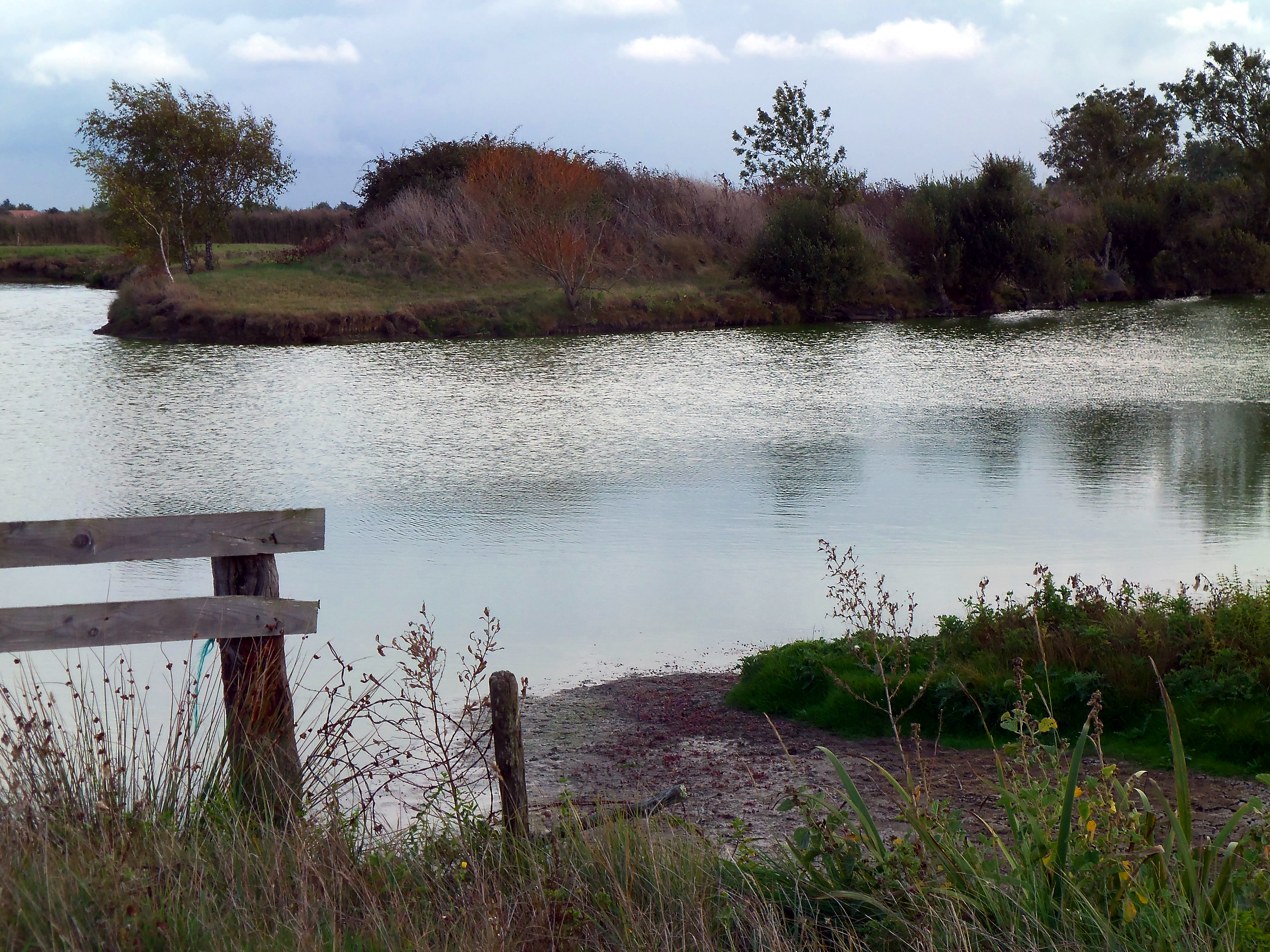
View of the marsh in Bouin in 2010.

Charette withdrew to the town of Bouin, where he regrouped a portion of his forces. Guérin joined him after holding a position at La Casse, near the courtyard of the local hospital. With the sea to his rear and no clear line of retreat, Charette prepared to attempt a breakout using a bayonet charge. At this stage, a resident of Bouin offered to guide him through the network of tidal channels and marshes that traversed the island.

The Republican forces advanced slowly and cautiously, anticipating potential ambushes. Upon entering the town, they expected to find Vendéan fighters entrenched in the church, but only women were present, sheltering in the turret of the bell tower staircase. Some isolated Vendéan combatants, either wounded or ill, were found in houses and were killed. Certain inhabitants of Bouin were also killed. The majority of the Vendéan forces, however, had already withdrawn from the town without leaving a trace.

The exact route taken by Charette and his forces to escape is not known with certainty. Based on local oral tradition, researchers such as Simone Loidreau and Lionel Dumarcet suggest that the Vendéans may have crossed the Poirocq bridge, followed the cart track of La Billarderie, crossed the Guérineau bridge, passed the farm of La Culgoiserie, and reached the small port of Les Billarderies, which was used for loading salt cargoes. At that time, the port, located on the bank of the Dain, was silted and no longer navigable by boats. The fugitives may then have crossed the Dain on foot during low tide, proceeding either via the Sartières and Boisseau Island or by Le Fresne, La Guitelle, and Les Petits Fresnes, before arriving at La Croix-Rouge. They reportedly reached the town of Châteauneuf around 3 p.m., which had been abandoned the previous day by Jordy’s troops. (Note: According to certain authors, the Vendéens used ningles, long poles that allowed them to leap over tidal channels and ditches. However, for Simone Loidreau, ningles were used in the Breton marsh only in the vicinity of Sallertaine and Le Perrier and were not in use at Bouin and Noirmoutier. Likewise for Lionel Dumarcet: “apart from the fact that the use of a ningle requires long experience, it is implausible to think that the fugitives could each have had such an instrument.” Some authors also claim that the tidal channels were frozen and passable on foot, which is likewise very doubtful according to Simone Loidreau and Lionel Dumarcet. According to them, the Vendéens leapt over the narrowest ditches and used planks for the wider tidal channels. This forced the royalists to abandon all their horses and their artillery.)

== Losses ==
Estimates of Republican losses during the battle were relatively low. Pierre-François Mourain, vice-president of the district of Les Sables-d’Olonne, reported in a letter to the town of Fontenay-le-Comte on 18 Frimaire (8 December) (Note: We learned yesterday of the triumphant entry of the republican troops into the island of Bouin. The victory they have won over the slaves of fanaticism and royalty is not as complete as it ought to have been; for those monsters would all have been destroyed if two columns, which did not engage, had done their duty. Charette and 2,000 men of his infernal troop thus escaped by the road to Bois-de-Céné, because the division that was to cut off the passage did not oppose them, or reached its post too late. The enemy numbered 2,500 men; 200 enemy dead are counted, and in this day they lost 500 horses and 6 pieces of cannon. We lost only two republicans and had 20 men wounded, because the defenders of the fatherland were positioned in such a way as to be almost not exposed to enemy fire, their artillery being too elevated. General Charette’s horse was brought here today by a cavalryman who will not ride it on his return; we shall have it sold for the benefit of the Republic. Although this horse is worth a higher price than its master individually, we would exchange it for him even giving change, without fearing reproach from you or from true republicans; but before we can possess him within our walls, to the great applause of the sans-culottes, he may have time to do us much harm; however, according to the report of many persons, he is beginning to feel his pulse. — Letter of Pierre-François Mourain, vice-president of the district of Les Sables-d’Olonne, addressed to Fontenay-le-Comte in the department “Vendée,” 18 Frimaire, Year II (December 8, 1793)) that two soldiers had been killed and 20 wounded. In contrast, Adjutant-General Jordy recorded 19 killed and 83 wounded, including eight seriously.

Estimates of Vendéan losses vary. Jordy reported that 1,000 were killed and only 800 managed to escape, while Generals Haxo and Mourain indicated around 200 fatalities. According to Lieutenant-Colonel Aubertin, 1,200 Vendéans fled. Royalist accounts, such as that of Le Bouvier-Desmortiers, suggest that about a quarter of the forces—approximately 700 men—were killed or wounded. Historian Émile Gabory gives a total of 200 killed. The number of sick and wounded executed in Bouin is uncertain; 25 victims, all local residents, have been identified. On 20 January, over thirty men were also reportedly executed near the port of La Claie.

The Vendéans lost between five and thirteen cannons, depending on the source: five according to General Dutruy, six according to Haxo, Mourain, and Le Bouvier-Desmortiers, and thirteen according to Jordy. They also lost a number of horses, with estimates ranging from 16 according to Haxo, 70 according to Aubertin, 200 according to Dutruy, and 500 according to Mourain. (Note: The Vendéens led out only a single horse, belonging to Dargens according to Le Bouvier-Desmortiers or to La Robrie according to Auvynet.)

Many women who had taken refuge in the church of Bouin were captured, though the exact number is uncertain. According to Lionel Dumarcet, the traditionally accepted figure is 300, while the municipality of Beauvoir-sur-Mer reports the arrest of 83 individuals, approximately thirty of whom were from Bouin, including 62 women, 45 of whom were not residents of the commune. The 62 women whose identities are known were sent to prisons in Nantes, including Le Bouffay and Le Bon Pasteur, or to the port of Les Sables-d’Olonne, from which some were later transferred to the island of Noirmoutier. Several of the women were executed in Nantes, shot at Noirmoutier, or died in prison. Among the captives were Madame de Couëtus, born Marie Gabrielle du Chilleau, wife of General Couëtus, and her two daughters, Sophie and Céleste. Madame de Couëtus was imprisoned in Nantes and subsequently executed by guillotine on 1 February 1794. Her daughters were released on 19 December 1794 by order of a representative on mission.

Following the capture of Bouin, Republican forces also freed several hundred prisoners held by the Vendéens. Estimates of their number vary: Jordy reported 900, which is considered an overestimate by Lionel Dumarcet and Simone Loidreau. Dutruy mentions 700 prisoners freed, while the anonymous Mémoires de l’administrateur militaire indicate between 200 and 300. This latter estimate is accepted by Loidreau, whereas historian Alain Gérard considers the number of prisoners freed to have been 127.

== Consequences ==
The Republican forces gained control of the island of Bouin, resulting in a victory, although Charette escaped with part of his troops. Subsequently, he encountered a small Republican convoy between Châteauneuf and Bois-de-Céné and withdrew into the bocage region, regrouping at Saint-Étienne-de-Mer-Morte. On 7 December, the force held a Mass and a Te Deum at Touvois, followed by an unsuccessful attempt to retake Legé. On 8 December, Charette’s troops joined the army of Jean-Baptiste Joly at Les Lucs-sur-Boulogne. The royalist leaders of Bas-Poitou and part of the Pays de Retz then spent three days reorganizing their forces. On 11 December, the Vendéens defeated the garrison at the camp of L’Oie. On the morning of 12 December, at Les Herbiers, Charette was elected commander-in-chief of the Catholic and Royal Army of Bas-Poitou.

== Analyses ==
In his Historical Clarifications, published during the Restoration, Charles-Joseph Auvynet criticizes what he describes as “hesitation, uncertainty, and absence of any fixed plan” on Charette’s part in the days preceding the Battle of Bouin. Auvynet argued that by engaging between La Garnache and Machecoul “on unfavorable ground,” Charette exposed his troops to “only the prospect of total destruction.” He characterized the subsequent defeat at Bouin as a “precipitate rout, accompanied by the greatest disorder,” which he suggested could have negatively affected the morale of the garrison on the island of Noirmoutier.

In 1998, historian Lionel Dumarcet similarly concluded that “Charette nevertheless had the possibility of avoiding the meshes of the Republican net. A few days earlier, Joly and Savin had succeeded in doing so.” He noted that Charette’s retreat to the island of Bouin and certain strategic decisions “could have led the chevalier and his men to annihilation,” but that chance ultimately prevented this outcome.

== See also ==
- Army of the West (France)
- Isle of Bouin
- François de Charette

== Bibliography ==
- Aubertin, Dominique (1824). Mémoires sur la guerre de la Vendée, en 1793 et 1794, par l'adjudant-général Aubertin [Memoirs on the War in the Vendée, in 1793 and 1794, by Adjutant General Aubertin] (in French). Paris: Baudoin frères.
- Baguenier Desormeaux, Henri (1893). Documents sur Noirmoutier et sur la mort de d'Elbée et de ses compagnons [Documents on Noirmoutier and on the death of Elbée and his companions] (in French). Vannes: Imprimerie Lafolye.
- Baudry, Henri (1986). L'histoire de l'île de Bouin [The history of Bouin Island] (in French). Les Sables-d'Olonne: Éditions Pinson.
- Chassin, Charles-Louis (1894). La Vendée Patriote 1793-1795 [The Patriotic Vendée 1793-1795] (in French). Vol. III. Paris: Paul Dupont.
- Chassin, Charles-Louis (1895). La Vendée Patriote 1793-1795 [The Patriotic Vendée 1793-1795] (in French). Vol. IV. Paris: Paul Dupont.
- Dumarcet, Lionel (1998). François Athanase Charette de La Contrie : Une histoire véritable [François Athanase Charette de La Contrie: A True Story] (in French). Les 3 Orangers. ISBN 978-2-912883-00-1.
- Gabory, Émile (2009). Les Guerres de Vendée [The Wars of the Vendée]. Bouquins (in French). Éditions Robert Laffont. ISBN 978-2-221-11309-7.
- Gérard, Alain (2013). Vendée : les archives de l'extermination [Vendée: the archives of extermination] (in French). La Roche-sur-Yon: Centre vendéen de recherches historiques. ISBN 978-2-911253-55-3.
- Gras, Yves (1994). La guerre de Vendée : 1793-1796 [The War in the Vendée: 1793–1796]. Campagnes et stratégies (in French). Paris: Economica. ISBN 978-2-7178-2600-5.
- Hussenet, Jacques (2007). « Détruisez la Vendée ! » Regards croisés sur les victimes et destructions de la guerre de Vendée [“Destroy the Vendée!” Different perspectives on the victims and destruction of the War in the Vendée] (in French). La Roche-sur-Yon: Centre vendéen de recherches historiques.
- Le Bouvier-Desmortiers, Urbain-René-Thomas (1809). Réfutation des calomnies publiées contre le général Charette commandant en chef les armées catholiques et royales dans la Vendée : Extrait d'un manuscrit sur la Vendée [Refutation of the slander published against General Charette, commander-in-chief of the Catholic and Royal armies in the Vendée: Excerpt from a manuscript on the Vendée] (in French).
- Loidreau, Simone (2010). "Charette l'insaisissable - 6 décembre 1793" [Charette the elusive - December 6, 1793]. Histoire militaire des guerres de Vendée [Military history of the Vendée wars] (in French). Economica.
- Lucas de La Championnière, Pierre-Suzanne (1994). Lucas de La Championnière, Mémoires d'un officier vendéen 1793-1796 [Lucas de La Championnière, Memoirs of a Vendée Officer, 1793–1796] (in French). Les Éditions du Bocage.
- Unknown (1823). Mémoires sur la Vendée comprenant les mémoires inédits d'un ancien administrateur militaire des armées républicaines, et ceux de Madame de Sapinaud [Memoirs on the Vendée, including the unpublished memoirs of a former military administrator of the Republican armies, and those of Madame de Sapinaud] (in French). Baudoin frères.
- Rousseau, Julien (1967). L'Isle au péril de la mer [The Isle at the Mercy of the Sea] (in French). Luçon: Imprimerie H. Rezeau J. Cadix Successeur. ISBN 2-307-33765-2.
- Savary, Jean Julien Michel (1824). Guerres des Vendéens et des Chouans contre la République française [Wars of the Vendéens and Chouans against the French Republic] (in French). Vol. II. Baudoin frères.
