= First Battle of Noirmoutier =

Coordinates: 46.9667°N 2.2167°W

- Part of the War in the Vendée
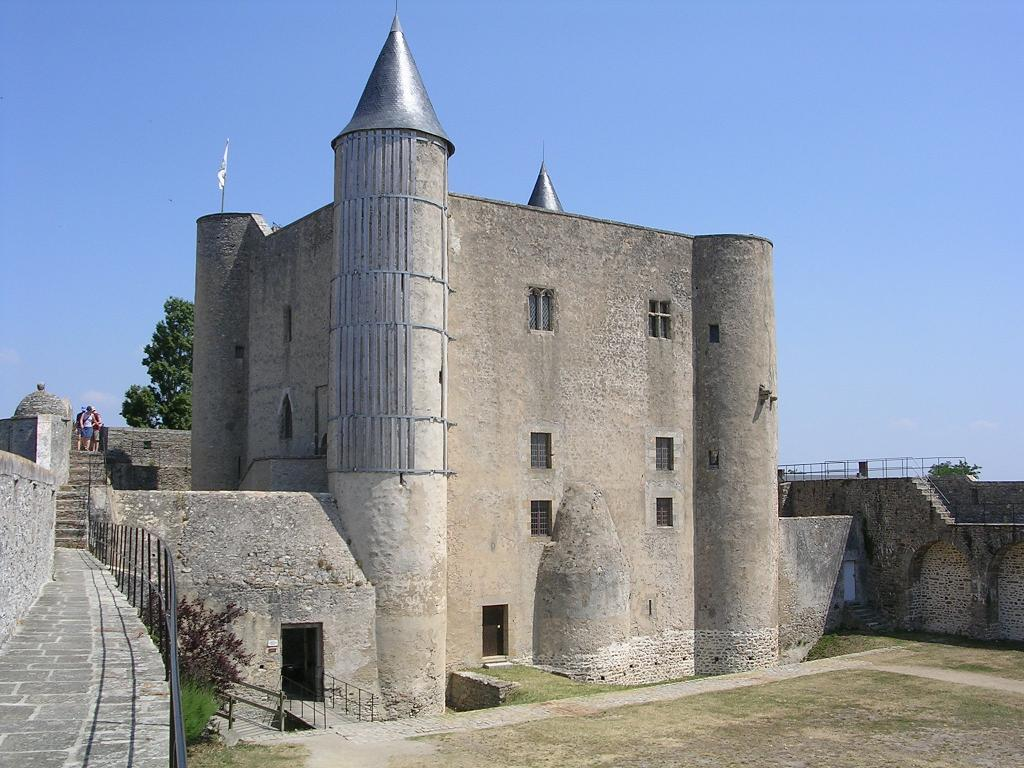
- Château de Noirmoutier
Date	12 October 1793
Location	Île de Noirmoutier
Result	Vendéen victory

Belligerents
(France) First French Republic	(Kingdom of France) Vendéens

Commanders and leaders
• Conrad Wieland (surrendered)	• François de Charette

Strength
800	3,000

Casualties and losses
800 prisoners 200 executed	

The First Battle of Noirmoutier took place on 12 October 1793 as part of the war in the Vendée. The Vendéens under François de Charette were victorious over the republican troops stationed there.

== Prelude ==
François de Charette had long contemplated taking the Île de Noirmoutier. The island's population was mostly favourable to the Vendéens, and its situation off the Atlantic coast was of strategic importance to communicate with Great Britain, or even to receive English or émigrés reinforcements.

During the night of 28 September, Charette had already tried attacking the island with 2,000 men, but his soldiers fled after the first shots fired.

== The battle ==
After their victory at the Battle of Saint-Fulgent on 22 September, Charette and Lescure had parted ways. Charette, general of the army of the Marais Breton, decided taking Noirmoutier was a priority.

On 9 October, Charette and his 3,000 men left Legé, which the republicans of general Nicolas Haxo occupied the next day. Charette first marched towards Saint-Gilles-Croix-de-Vie, but seeing the town was well defended he finally went to Bouin on 11 October and had his troops stationed there.

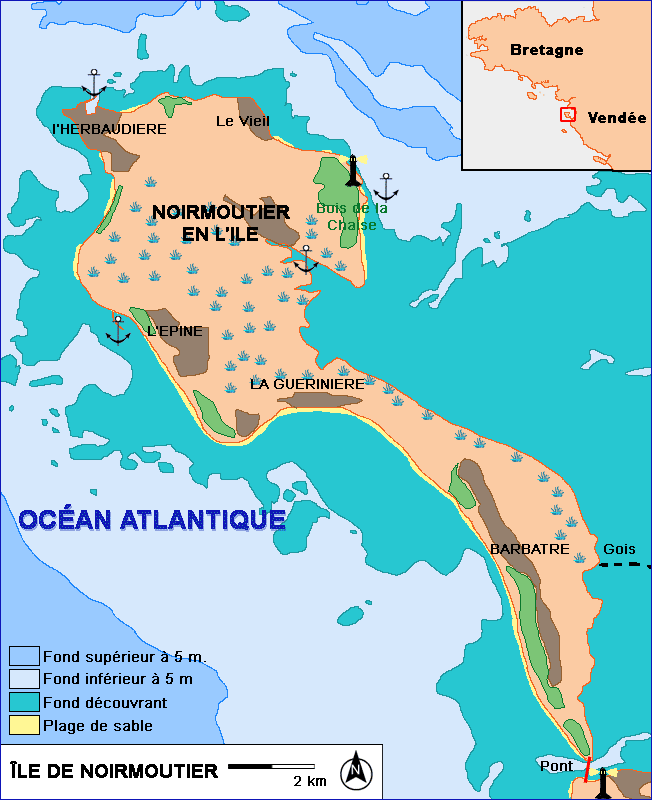
Map of the Île de Noirmoutier

The passage du Gois was the only place where the island was accessible by foot, but only during a low tide. On 12 October, at 1 in the morning, Charette and his men started marching on the passage. Suddenly, after a few minutes the Vendéens realised the tide was rising behind them, and that going back was impossible. This was a voluntary manoeuvre by Charette who didn't want his men to flee again like in September. He told his men that there was no other way than victory or death.

With no other choice, the Vendéens launched an attack and captured by surprise the artillery north of Barbâtre which was guarding the passage de Goix. The population of Barbâtre joined the Vendéen soldiers. They then marched to the north and pushed back a republican detachment at the pointe de La Casie. Richer, the commander of the detachment, was killed by Charette himself.

The Vendéens could then march to Noirmoutier-en-l'Île. The republicans, commanded by adjutant general Conrad Wieland pulled back in the castle. But Wieland realised he had no chance of victory, and had his troops surrender.

Charette then offered Wieland to join his army, which he refused. He was still freed, as well as his officers as long as they did not leave Noirmoutier. On the other hand, the soldiers were considered prisoners of war.

== Massacres ==
On 15 October, Charette left Noirmoutier with half of his troops to defend it. René de Tinguy and Dubois de La Pastelière were given command.

Charette left his prisoners at Bouin under the surveillance of one of his officers, Pageot, who placed them in the town's prisons. Among the prisoners were some soldiers of the Chasseurs de la Manche who were guilty of executions at Machecoul in April 1793. After some troubles in the prisons because of the overcrowding, Pageot used the excuse of a revolt to order executions; many prisoners were shot, including some from Noirmoutier who hadn't participated in any massacres. Approximately 200 of the 800 prisoners were executed.

== See also ==
- Battle of Noirmoutier (1794)
- Battle of Bouin

== Sources ==
- Jean Tabeur, Paris contre la Province, les guerres de l'Ouest, éditions Economica, 2008, pp. 143–144.
- Yves Gras, La Guerre de Vendée, éditions Economica, 1994 p. 80.
