= Pierre Marchand (editor) =

French publisher (1939–2002)

- Born: 17 November 1939; Bouin, France
- Died: 4 April 2002 (aged 62); Paris, France
- Occupations: Editor, publisher

Pierre Marchand (17 November 1939 – 4 April 2002) was a significant figure in French publishing history, who gave French publishing an international dimension. He created the magazine Voiles et Voiliers ("Sails and Sailboats") with Jean-Olivier Héron in 1971. He joined Éditions Gallimard in 1972 and immediately founded Gallimard Jeunesse, the youth department and subsidiary of Éditions Gallimard, which he managed until 1999, notably creating a number of well-known collections, such as "1000 Soleils" ("1000 Suns", 1973), "Folio Junior" (1977), "Folio Benjamin" (1980), as well as "Découvertes Gallimard" (1986).

== Biography ==
Pierre Marchand was born on 17 November 1939 in Bouin, a small port of the Marais breton in Vendée. He left for Paris at the age of 17 or 18, after being angry with his father. He entered the Blanchard printing house in Paris.

After having been an apprentice typographer at the printing house, he did his military service in Algeria from 1959 to 1962. Upon his return to Paris, he took various odd jobs, such as vacuum cleaner salesman and storekeeper. He entered the publishing community at Éditions Fleurus as a storekeeper. He left Fleurus in 1971 to create the monthly magazine Voiles et Voiliers with Jean-Olivier Héron, which became a financial failure.

In 1972, he joined Éditions Gallimard and created its youth department. He became friends with the German graphic designer Raymond Stoffel, with whom he created his most beautiful books. The first four titles of the collection “1000 Soleils” inaugurated Gallimard Jeunesse. In 1977, the first pocket collection for 10- to 16-year-olds, the “Folio Junior”, which sold tens of millions of copies. In 1983, Gallimard Jeunesse’s documentation centre was born with the collection “Découvertes Cadet”, then the “Découvertes Benjamin” (1984). But it was in 1986, with another pocket collection, the “Découvertes Gallimard”, that all the inventiveness of Pierre Marchand has been expressed. He became an “Artistic Master” for creating this new kind of fully illustrated encyclopaedia with a dynamic layout. The collection is considered an example of ‘art as part of everyday life’ in the case study research on the so-called “dual postmodern aestheticisation movement”.

According to Hedwige Pasquet, the current president of Gallimard Jeunesse, and Christine Baker, Marchand “liked to upset and destroy, in order to build again […] He couldn’t suffer an error of visual taste or the sin of banality, in a colour, a proportion, a line… […] He had to mold, to control; the ambition of the 18th-century French encyclopaedists was underlying every idea.”

In 1999, at the age of 60 and had been working for 27 years at Gallimard, Marchand became a creative director at Hachette, then the head of Hachette Illustrated branch. He died from cancer in 2002.

== Bibliography ==
- Jean-Luc Douin, « Pierre Marchand. L’homme des illuminations », Télérama (nº 2361), 12 April 1995, pp. 46–47.

== See also ==
- Découvertes Gallimard
- Gallimard Jeunesse
