= Isle of Bouin =

Native name: Île de Bouin
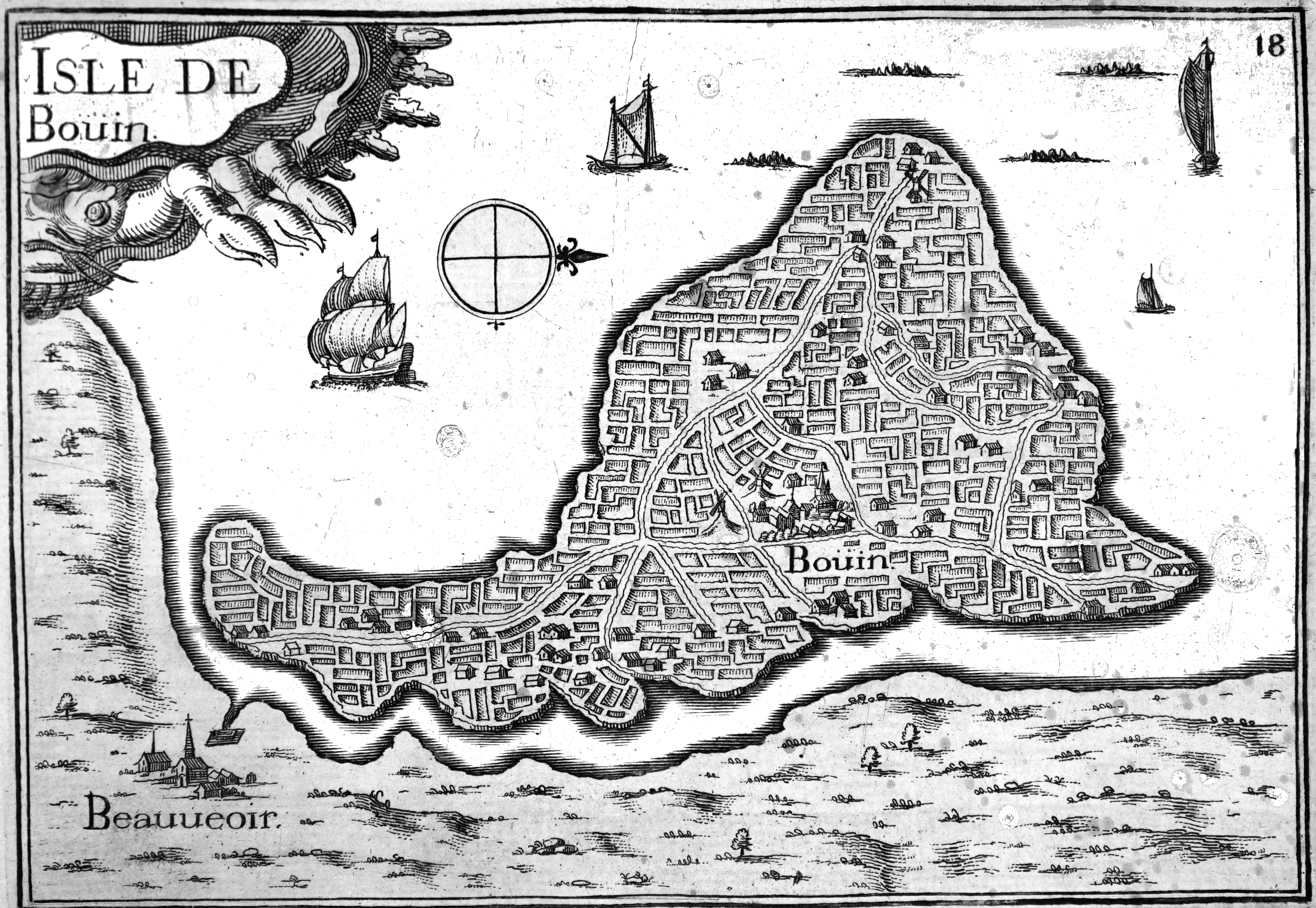
- 1634 map by Christophe Tassin.
- Interactive map of Isle of Bouin

Geography
- Coordinates: 46°58′40″N 2°00′25″W
- Archipelago: None
- Region: Pays de la Loire
- Department: Vendée
- France

The Isle of Bouin or Boing (French: Île de Bouin [il də bwɛ̃]) no longer actually exists as it has silted up. It was part of a vast area of marsh located around Bouin, separated from the mainland by the course of the River Dain. The creation of a dyke protecting the Breton Marsh from storm surges resulted in a reclamation of the island that increased the land area inland of the Bay of Bourgneuf.

== History ==
The Isle of Bouin was pillaged and razed by the Vikings in 813 and by the French in 1471 (the town was Breton at the time) during the wars between Brittany and France.

During the Vendée Wars, the island was renamed "Ile Marat" by the revolutionaries in homage to Jean-Paul Marat, assassinated on 13 July 1793. In the 14th century, the island benefited from island franchises, favourable to the development of contraband. In the 17th century, as on the Île d'Yeu, the islanders grew their own tobacco plants. This clandestine trade became so flourishing that they had to engage in massive importation. Companies trading in fake snuffboxes, involving all layers of island society, were created to regulate the traffic. The boats sailed in flotillas to the north to bring back "good" tobacco, then stored in warehouses.

Before 1789, Bouin was part of the Bishopric of Nantes. Politically, it belonged to the Marche de Bretagne, therefore came under both Poitou and Brittany. In 1789, its representatives asked, in vain, that it be attached to the department of Loire-Inferior, with Nantes as its capital.

The place is cited as the southern limit of Brittany in the 1843 edition of the Historical and geographical dictionary of Brittany.

== See also ==
- Bouin (Vendée)
- Battle of Bouin
