= Châteauneuf, Vendée =

Châteauneuf
- Commune
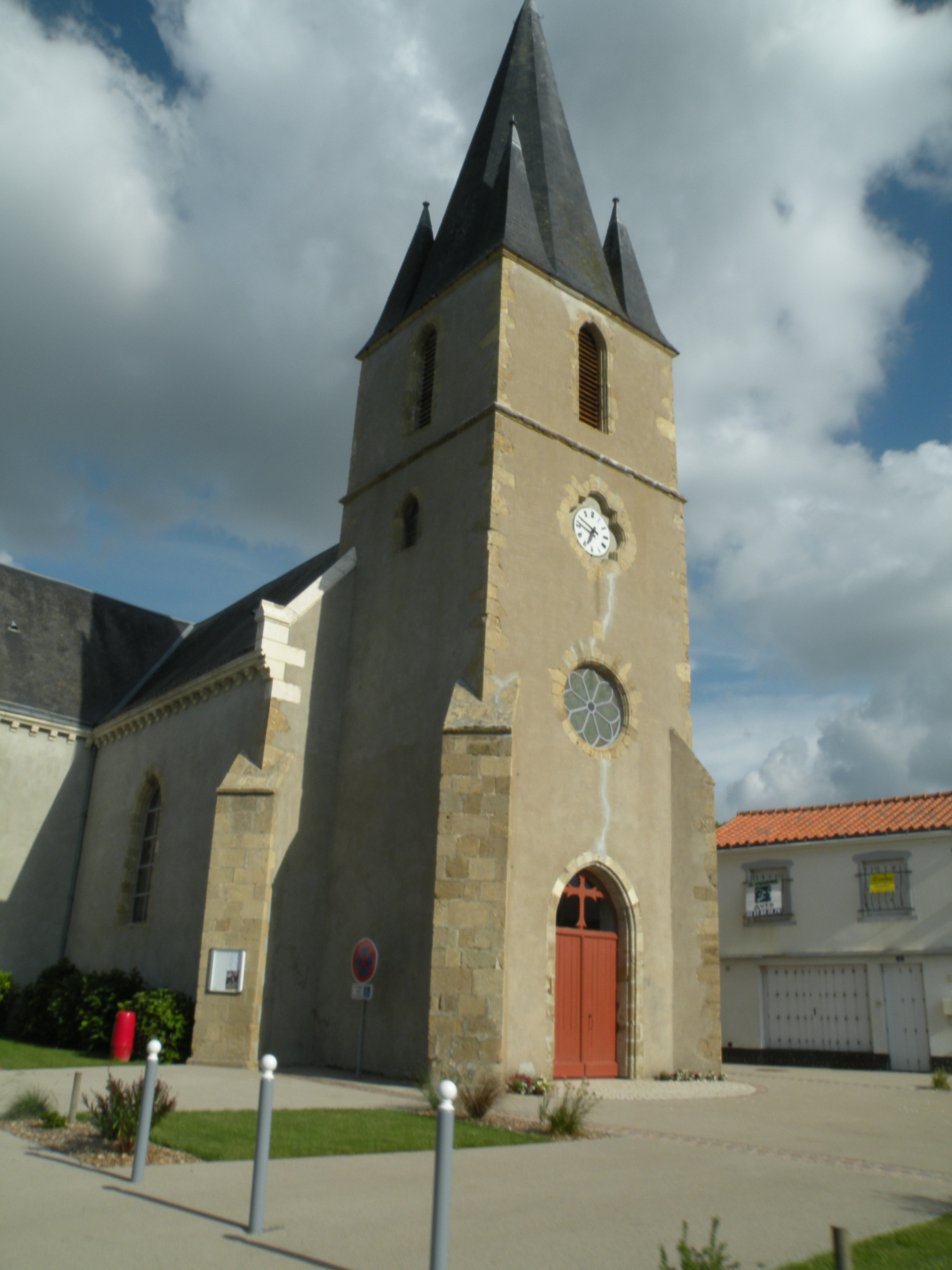
- The church in Châteauneuf
- Location of Châteauneuf
- Location within France Location within Pays de la Loire
- Coordinates: 46°55′06″N 1°54′32″W
- Country: France
- Region: Pays de la Loire
- Department: Vendée
- Arrondissement: Les Sables-d'Olonne
- Canton: Challans
- Intercommunality: Challans-Gois Communauté

Government
  - Mayor (2020–2026): Michel Woloch
- Area^{1}: 15.92 km^{2} (6.15 sq mi)
- Highest elevation: 34 m (112 ft)
- Lowest elevation: 1 m (3.3 ft)
- Population (2023): 1,140
  - Density: 71.6/km^{2} (185/sq mi)
- Time zone: UTC+01:00 (CET)
  - Summer (DST): UTC+02:00 (CEST)
- INSEE/Postal code: 85062 /85710
- ^{1} French Land Register data, which excludes lakes, ponds, glaciers > 1 km^{2} (0.386 sq mi or 247 acres) and river estuaries.

Châteauneuf (French pronunciation: [ʃɑtonœf]) is a commune of the Vendée department in the Pays de la Loire region in western France.

== See also ==
- Communes of the Vendée department
