= Touvois =

- Commune
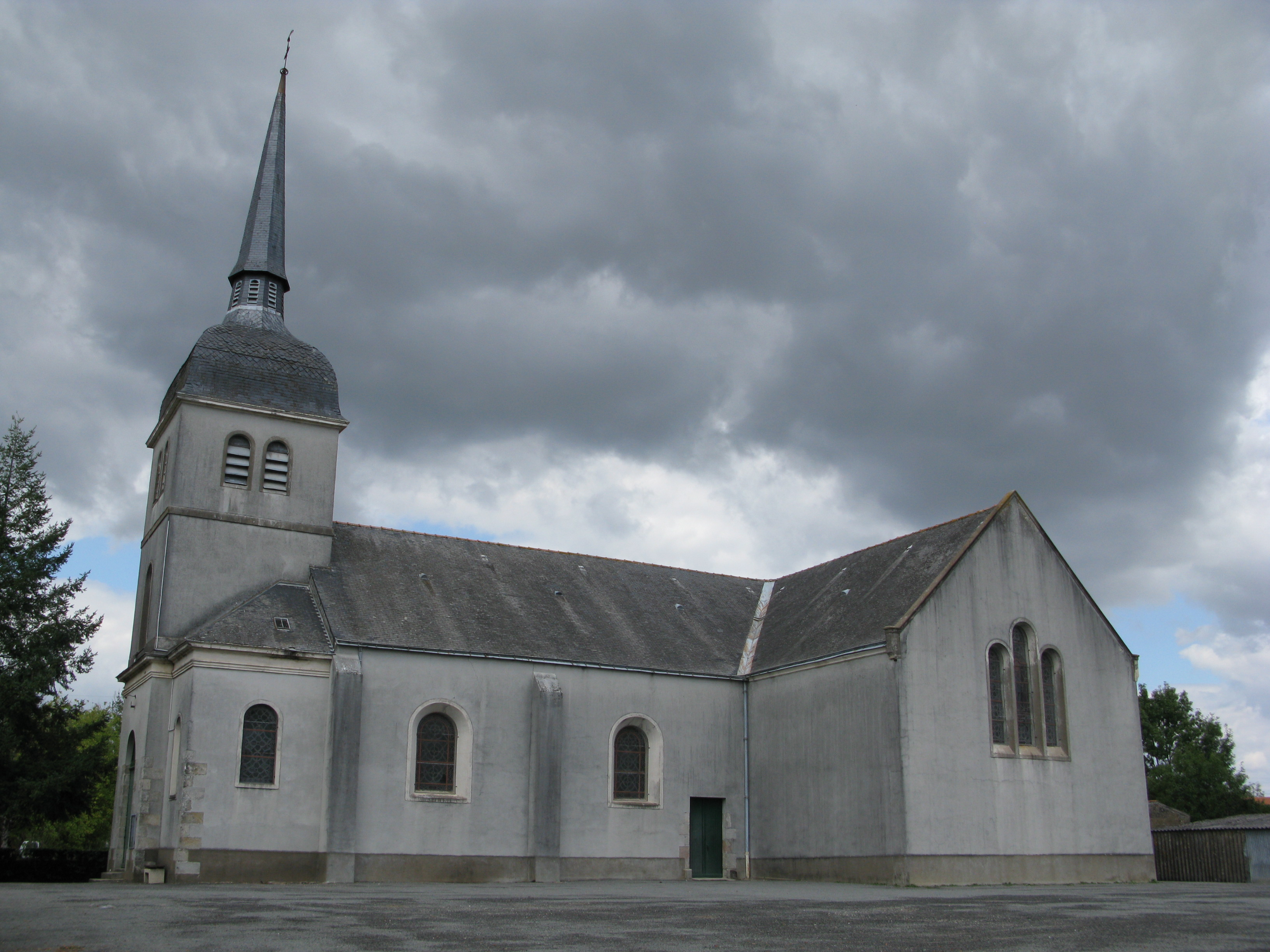
- The church in Touvois

- Coat of arms
- Location of Touvois
- Location within France Location within Pays de la Loire
- Coordinates: 46°54′12″N 1°40′55″W
- Country: France
- Region: Pays de la Loire
- Department: Loire-Atlantique
- Arrondissement: Nantes
- Canton: Saint-Philbert-de-Grand-Lieu
- Intercommunality: Sud Retz Atlantique

Government
  - Mayor (2020–2026): Claude Le Calvez
- Area^{1}: 39.21 km^{2} (15.14 sq mi)
- Highest elevation: 61 m (200 ft)
- Lowest elevation: 18 m (59 ft)
- Population (2023): 1,970
  - Density: 50.2/km^{2} (130/sq mi)
- Demonym(s): Touvoisiennes, Touvoisiens
- Time zone: UTC+01:00 (CET)
  - Summer (DST): UTC+02:00 (CEST)
- INSEE/Postal code: 44206 /44650
- ^{1} French Land Register data, which excludes lakes, ponds, glaciers > 1 km^{2} (0.386 sq mi or 247 acres) and river estuaries.

Touvois (French pronunciation: [tuvwa]; Breton: Tolvez) is a commune in the Loire-Atlantique department in western France.

== See also ==
- Communes of the Loire-Atlantique department
