= Nicolas Haxo =

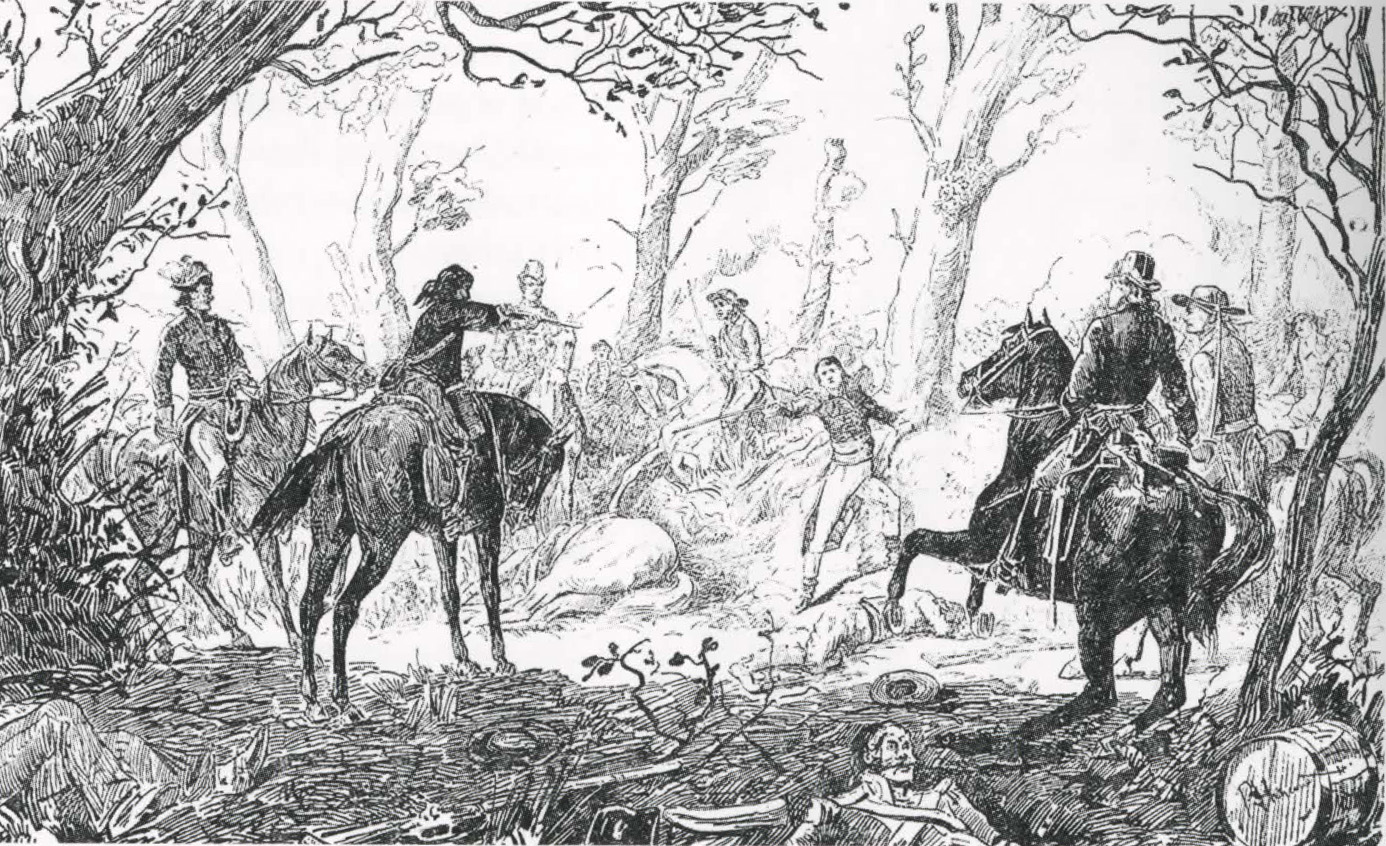
Death of General Haxo at the Battle of the Clouzeaux, Vendée War, 1794.

Nicolas Haxo (French pronunciation: [nikɔlɑ akso]; 7 June 1749 – 20 March 1794) was a French general in the French Revolutionary Wars.

He took part in the War in the Vendée, and committed suicide to avoid capture at Les Clouzeaux.
