= Legé =

Legé Lejaé/Ljaï (Gallo) Levieg (Breton)
- Commune
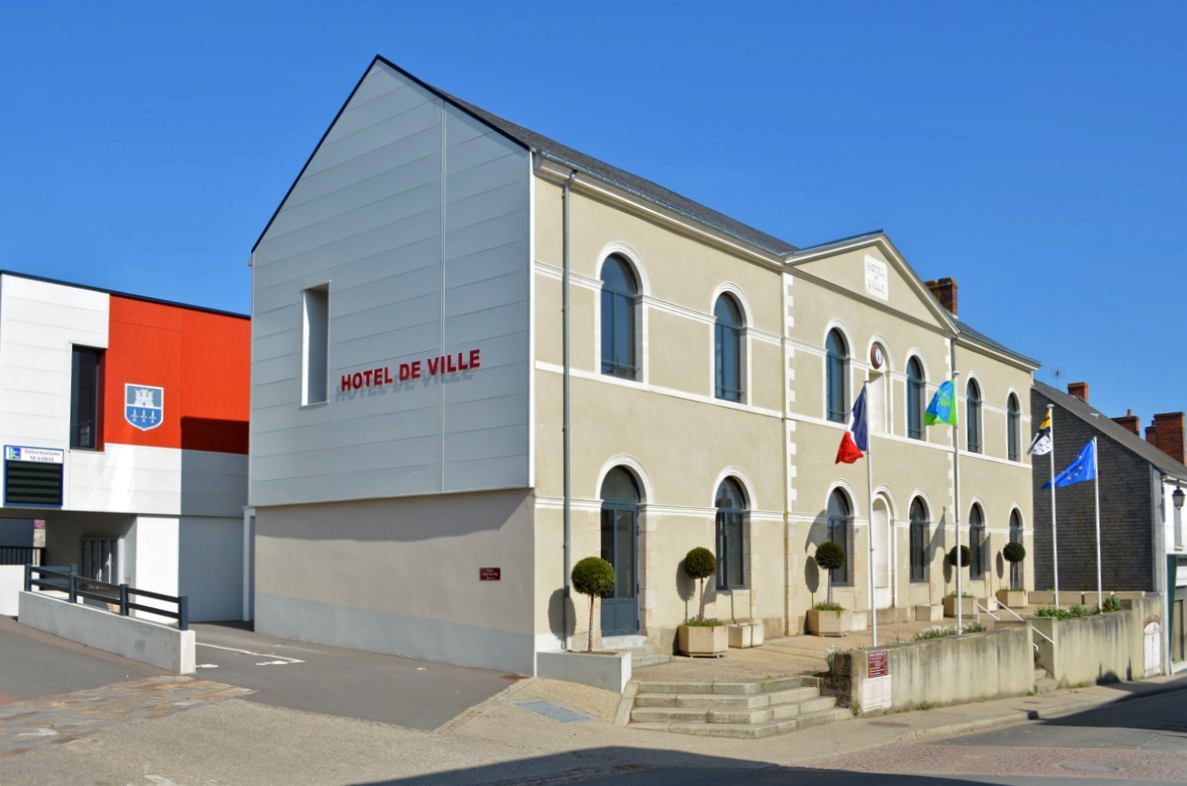
- Town hall

- Coat of arms
- Location of Legé
- Location within France Location within Pays de la Loire
- Coordinates: 46°53′11″N 1°35′51″W
- Country: France
- Region: Pays de la Loire
- Department: Loire-Atlantique
- Arrondissement: Nantes
- Canton: Saint-Philbert-de-Grand-Lieu
- Intercommunality: Sud Retz Atlantique

Government
  - Mayor (2020–2026): Thierry Grassineau
- Area^{1}: 63.32 km^{2} (24.45 sq mi)
- Highest elevation: 94 m (308 ft)
- Lowest elevation: 18 m (59 ft)
- Population (2023): 4,817
  - Density: 76.07/km^{2} (197.0/sq mi)
- Time zone: UTC+01:00 (CET)
  - Summer (DST): UTC+02:00 (CEST)
- INSEE/Postal code: 44081 /44650
- ^{1} French Land Register data, which excludes lakes, ponds, glaciers > 1 km^{2} (0.386 sq mi or 247 acres) and river estuaries.

Legé (French pronunciation: [ləʒe]; Gallo: Lejaé or Ljaï, Breton: Levieg) is a commune in the Loire-Atlantique department in western France.

== Population ==
Historical population

Year	Pop.	±% p.a.
1800	2,893	—
1821	3,116	+0.35%
1846	3,614	+0.59%
1872	4,455	+0.81%
1901	4,431	−0.02%
1926	3,648	−0.77%
1946	3,604	−0.06%
1962	3,454	−0.27%
1968	3,521	+0.32%

Year	Pop.	±% p.a.
1975	3,433	−0.36%
1982	3,441	+0.03%
1990	3,532	+0.33%
1999	3,586	+0.17%
2007	3,989	+1.34%
2012	4,350	+1.75%
2017	4,514	+0.74%
2023	4,817	+1.09%

Source: EHESS and INSEE (1968–2023)

== See also ==
- Communes of the Loire-Atlantique department
