= Beauvoir-sur-Mer =

- Commune
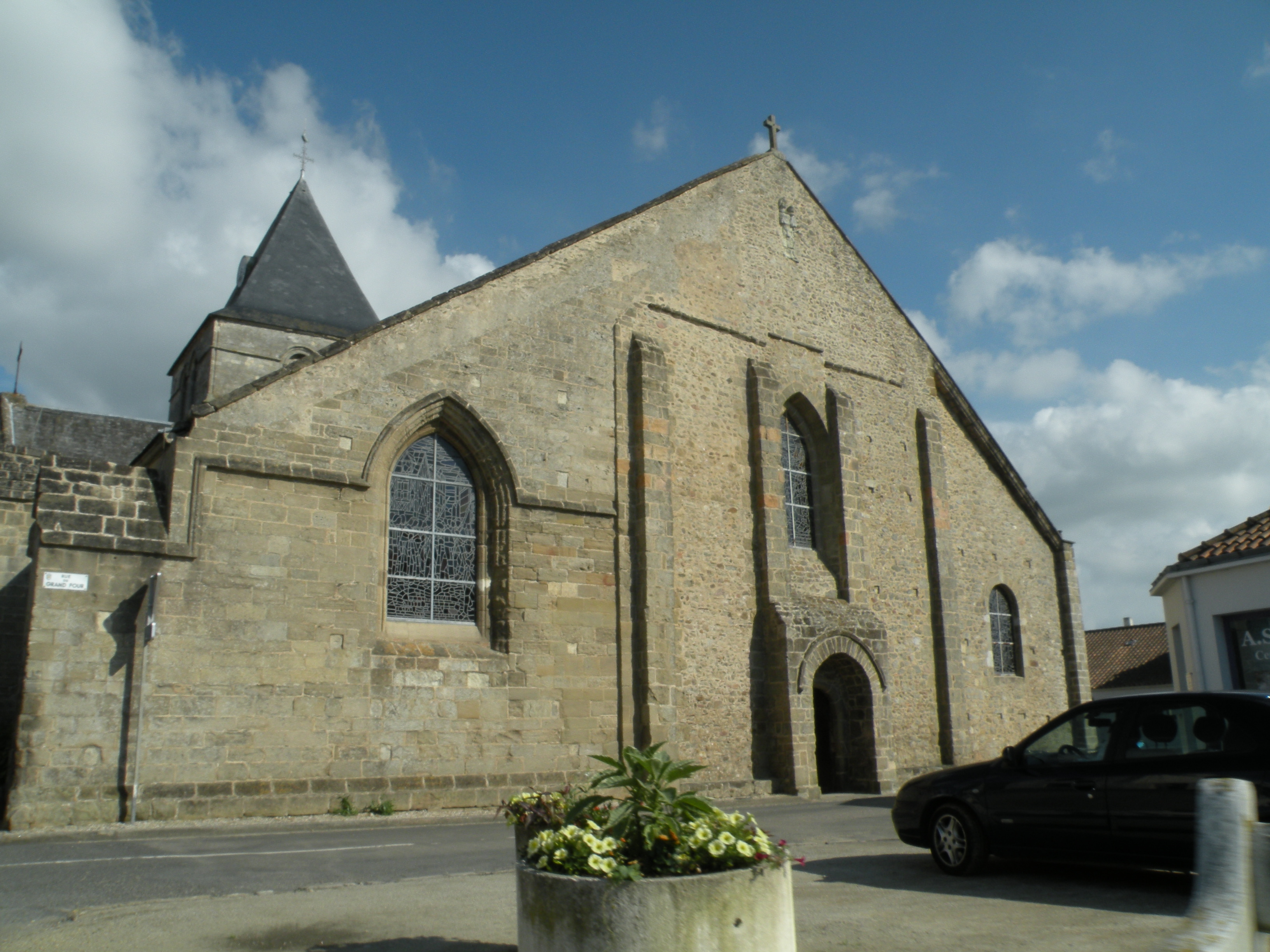
- The church of Saint-Philibert, in Beauvoir-sur-Mer

- Coat of arms
- Location of Beauvoir-sur-Mer
- Location within France Location within Pays de la Loire
- Coordinates: 46°55′01″N 2°02′29″W
- Country: France
- Region: Pays de la Loire
- Department: Vendée
- Arrondissement: Les Sables-d'Olonne
- Canton: Saint-Jean-de-Monts
- Intercommunality: Challans-Gois

Government
  - Mayor (2020–2026): Jean-Yves Billon
- Area^{1}: 35.19 km^{2} (13.59 sq mi)
- Highest elevation: 26 m (85 ft)
- Lowest elevation: 0 m (0 ft)
- Population (2023): 4,035
  - Density: 114.7/km^{2} (297.0/sq mi)
- Time zone: UTC+01:00 (CET)
  - Summer (DST): UTC+02:00 (CEST)
- INSEE/Postal code: 85018 /85230
- ^{1} French Land Register data, which excludes lakes, ponds, glaciers > 1 km^{2} (0.386 sq mi or 247 acres) and river estuaries.

Beauvoir-sur-Mer (French pronunciation: [bovwaʁ syʁ mɛʁ], literally Beauvoir on Sea) is a commune in the Vendée department in the administrative region of the Pays de la Loire, France.

== Population ==
Historical population
Year	Pop.	±% p.a.
1968	2,798	—
1975	3,041	+1.20%
1982	3,165	+0.57%
1990	3,277	+0.44%
1999	3,399	+0.41%
2007	3,689	+1.03%
2012	3,930	+1.27%
2017	3,904	−0.13%
2023	4,035	+0.55%
Source: INSEE

== See also ==
- Communes of the Vendée department
