= La Garnache =

- Commune
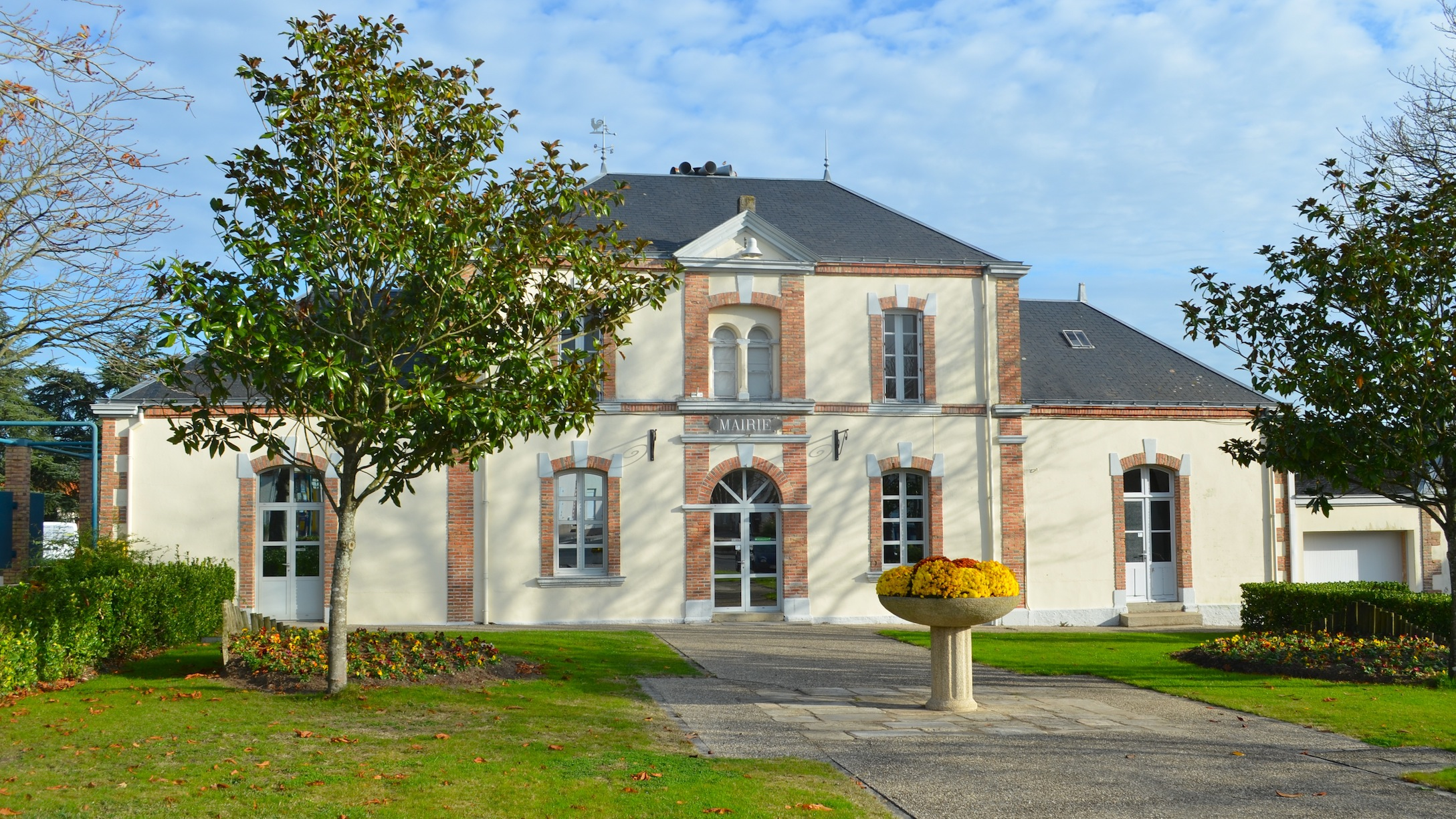
- The town hall in La Garnache

- Coat of arms
- Location of La Garnache
- Location within France Location within Pays de la Loire
- Coordinates: 46°53′29″N 1°49′47″W
- Country: France
- Region: Pays de la Loire
- Department: Vendée
- Arrondissement: Les Sables-d'Olonne
- Canton: Challans

Government
  - Mayor (2020–2026): François Petit
- Area^{1}: 59.49 km^{2} (22.97 sq mi)
- Elevation: 25 m (82 ft)
- Highest elevation: 52 m (171 ft)
- Lowest elevation: 8 m (26 ft)
- Population (2023): 5,515
  - Density: 92.70/km^{2} (240.1/sq mi)
- Time zone: UTC+01:00 (CET)
  - Summer (DST): UTC+02:00 (CEST)
- INSEE/Postal code: 85096 /85710
- ^{1} French Land Register data, which excludes lakes, ponds, glaciers > 1 km^{2} (0.386 sq mi or 247 acres) and river estuaries.

La Garnache (French pronunciation: [la ɡaʁnaʃ]) is a commune in the Vendée department in the Pays de la Loire region in western France.

== Population ==
Historical population
Year	Pop.	±% p.a.
1968	2,628	—
1975	2,807	+0.95%
1982	3,152	+1.67%
1990	3,379	+0.87%
1999	3,576	+0.63%
2007	4,276	+2.26%
2012	4,630	+1.60%
2017	4,995	+1.53%
2023	5,515	+1.66%
Source: INSEE

== See also ==
- Communes of the Vendée department
- François de Charette
