= Marais Breton =

Coordinates: 46°55′28″N 2°03′14″W

Designations

Ramsar Wetland
- Official name: Marais Breton, Baie de Bourgneuf, Ile de Noirmoutier et Forêt de Monts
- Designated: 2 February 2017
- Reference no.: 2283

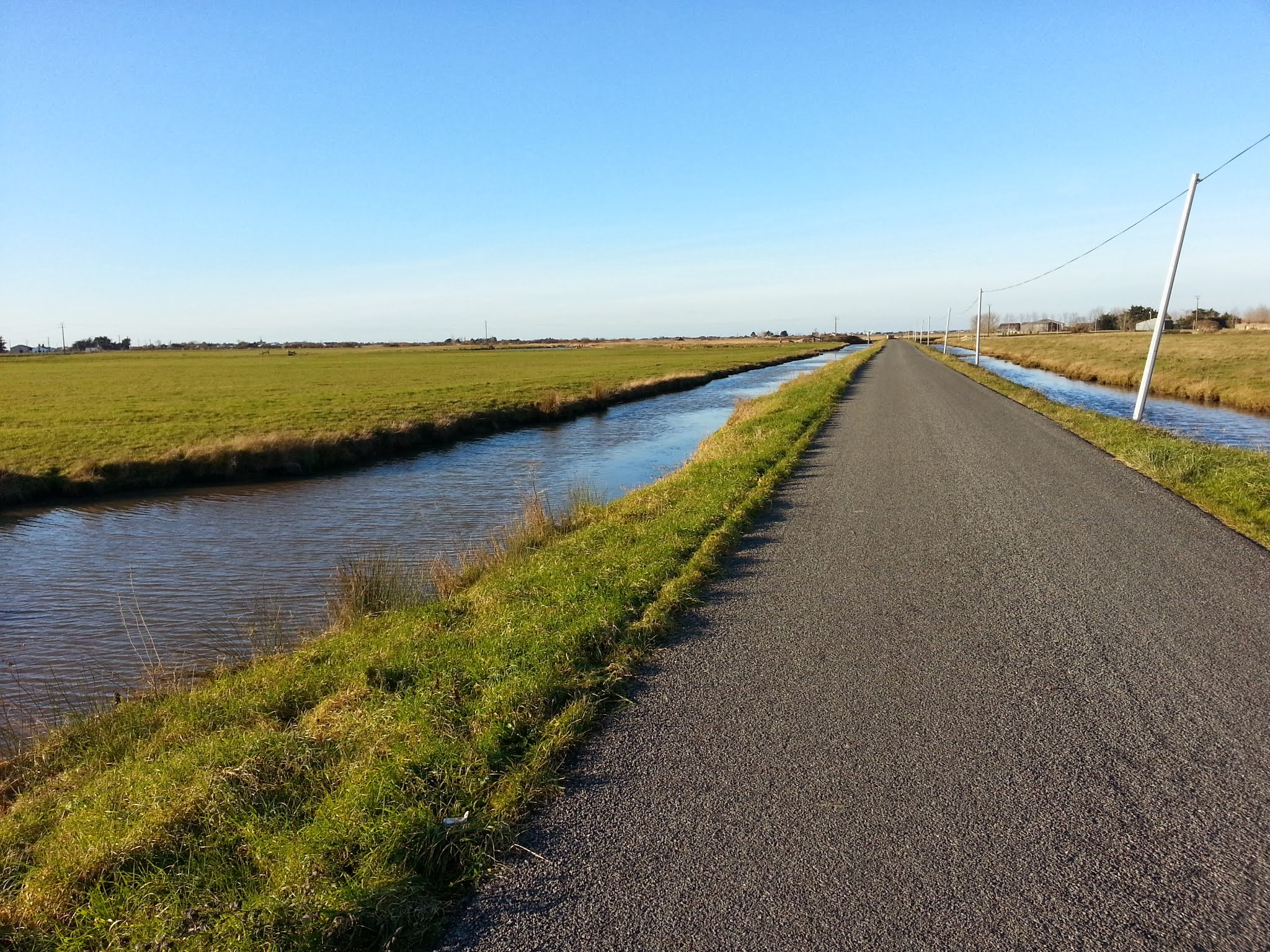

The Marais Breton (French pronunciation: [maʁɛ bʁətɔ̃], "Breton Marsh"; Breton: Palud Breizh; or Marais Breton-Vendéen; Palud Breizh-Wened) is a zone géographique humide (humid geographic zone) along France's Atlantic coast. It marks the border between two traditional French provinces, Brittany and Poitou, and extends between two French departments, Loire-Atlantique and Vendée, both of which included in the administrative region of Pays de la Loire.

The Marais Breton is protected by levees and dunes, stabilized by the pines of the forest of Pays de Monts. Some areas, such as Bouin are below sea level and were once subject to storm surges. A valve system blocking salt water from entering portions of the marsh was also developed to accommodate the marsh waters to agriculture.

== Culture ==
The Marais Breton has a tradition of music and dance similar to its neighbors the Bocage vendéen and Upper Brittany, but it also has its own local instrument, the veuze bagpipe, and its own dance, the Maraîchine.

== Fauna and flora ==
Per the Natura 2000, the Marais Breton is part of a larger geographic cadre which also include the forêt des Pays de Monts, the Bay of Bourgneuf, and the île de Noirmoutier.

== See also ==
- Marais Poitevin
