= Bouin, Vendée =

Bouin
- Commune
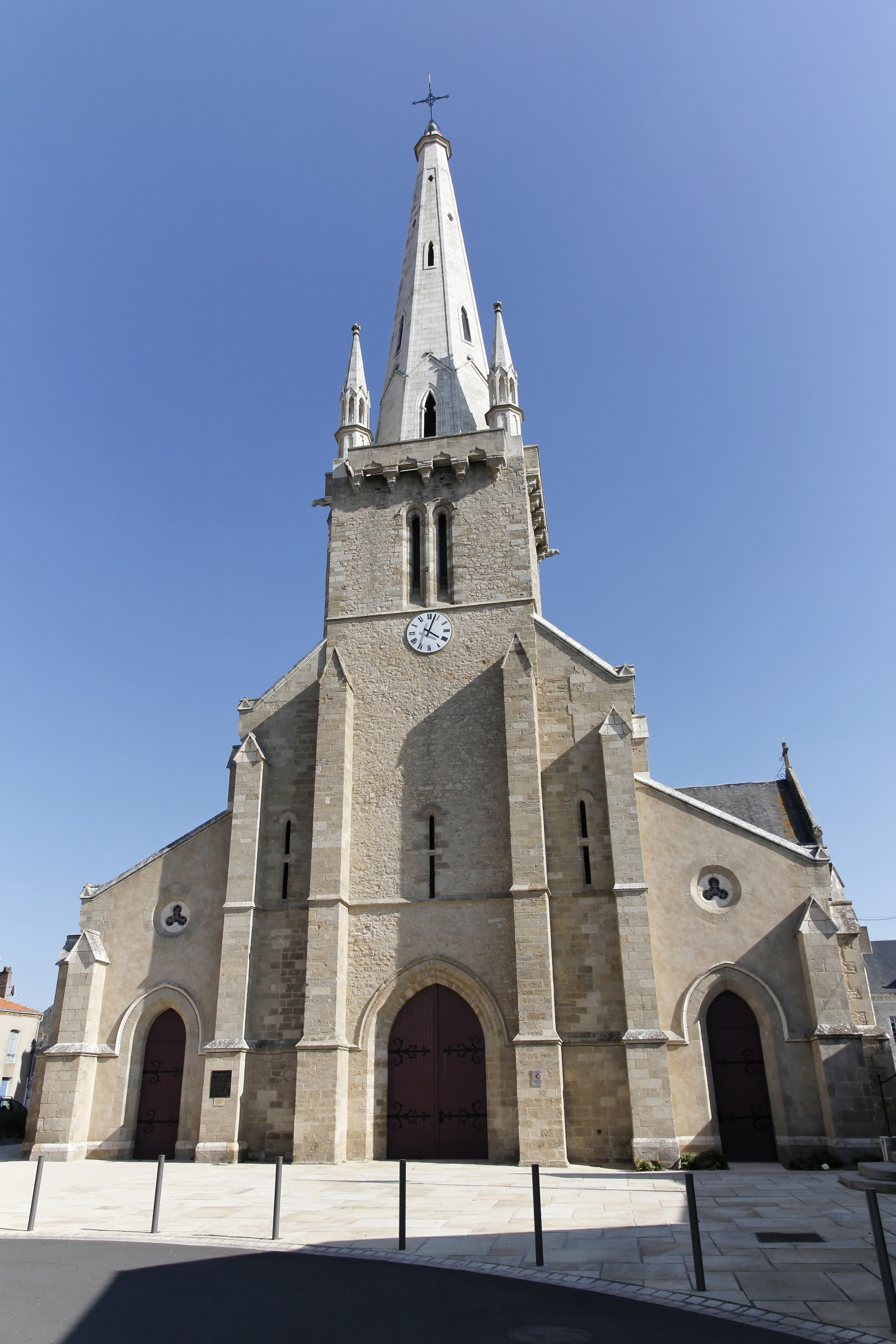
- The church of Our Lady, in Bouin

- Coat of arms
- Location of Bouin
- Location within France Location within Pays de la Loire
- Coordinates: 46°58′28″N 2°00′02″W
- Country: France
- Region: Pays de la Loire
- Department: Vendée
- Arrondissement: Les Sables-d'Olonne
- Canton: Saint-Jean-de-Monts
- Intercommunality: Challans-Gois

Government
  - Mayor (2020–2026): Thomas Gisbert
- Area^{1}: 51.31 km^{2} (19.81 sq mi)
- Highest elevation: 6 m (20 ft)
- Lowest elevation: 0 m (0 ft)
- Population (2023): 2,205
  - Density: 42.97/km^{2} (111.3/sq mi)
- Time zone: UTC+01:00 (CET)
  - Summer (DST): UTC+02:00 (CEST)
- INSEE/Postal code: 85029 /85230
- ^{1} French Land Register data, which excludes lakes, ponds, glaciers > 1 km^{2} (0.386 sq mi or 247 acres) and river estuaries.

Bouin (French pronunciation: [bwɛ̃]) is a commune in the Vendée department in the Pays de la Loire region in western France.

== Population ==
Historical population
Year	Pop.	±% p.a.
1968	2,146	—
1975	2,237	+0.60%
1982	2,292	+0.35%
1990	2,268	−0.13%
1999	2,242	−0.13%
2007	2,201	−0.23%
2012	2,177	−0.22%
2017	2,156	−0.19%
2023	2,205	+0.38%
Source: INSEE

== See also ==
- Communes of the Vendée department
- Isle of Bouin
