= Strait of Fromentine =

- Strait of Fromentine (British English); Détroit de Fromentine (French)
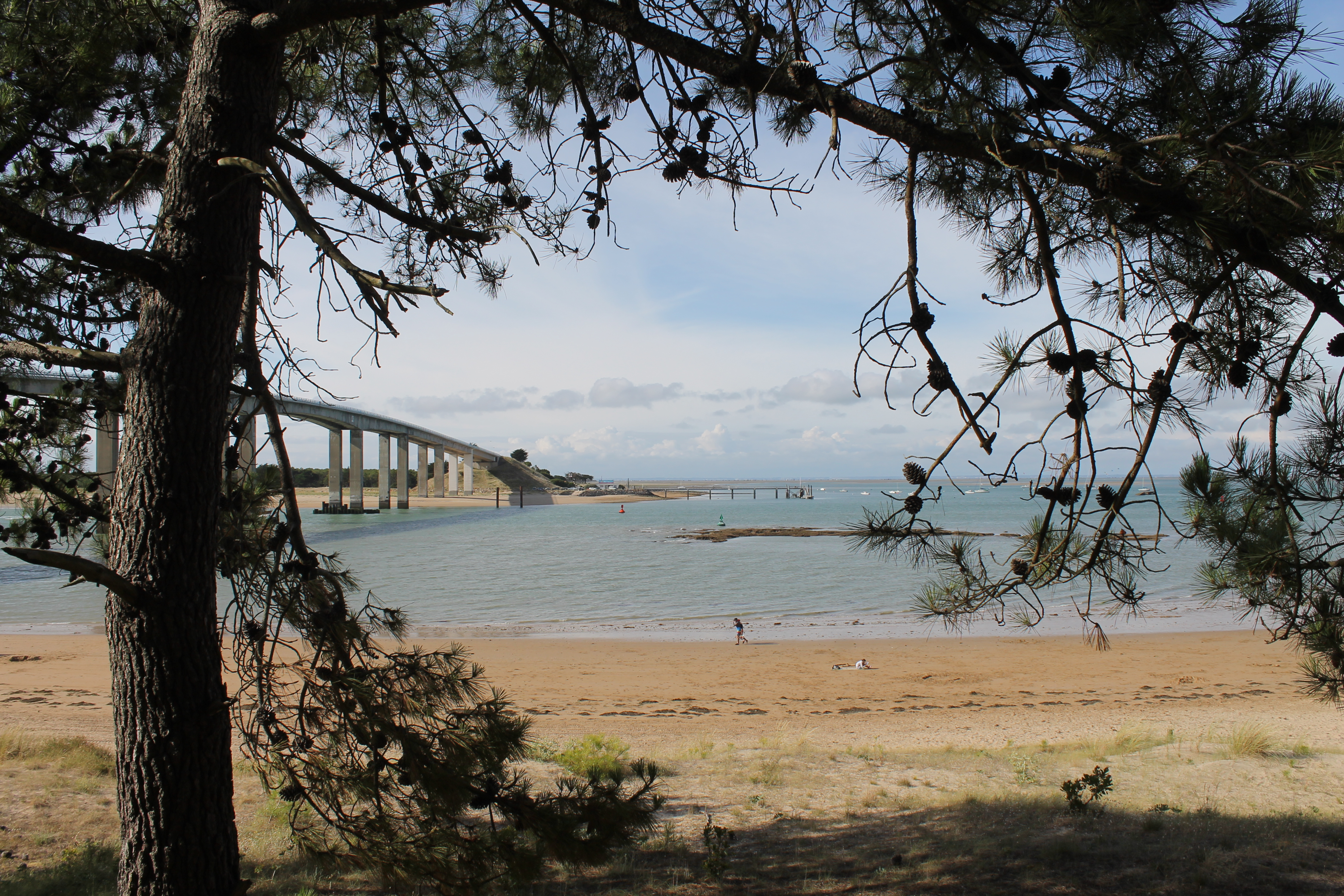
- The Strait of Fromentine looking north to Noirmoutier from the Barre-de-Monts linked by the Noirmoutier Bridge.

- Location of the Strait of Fromentine
- Location: Vendée
- Coordinates: 46°53′N 2°9′W
- Type: Strait
- Part of: Bay of Bourgneuf, Bay of Biscay
- Basin countries: France
- Min. width: 0.34 km (0.21 mi)

The Strait of Fromentine (French: Détroit de Fromentine or Goulet de Fromentine) is the maritime passage that separates the island of Noirmoutier from the mainland, connecting the south of the Bay of Bourgneuf (or "Bay of Brittany") to the north of the Bay of Biscay.

Its maximum width is approximately 450 meters between the “tip of the Fosse” (commune of Barbâtre, at the southern end of Noirmoutier) and the Pays-de-Monts National Forest. It has a maximum depth of 18 m. Given its narrowness, it is subject to strong tidal currents, which typically reach 1.5 metres per second (2.9 kn) at the surface. It owes its name to the town of Fromentine, a port suburb of the municipality of La Barre-de-Monts, located on the continent in its eastern part. In 1704, a map by engineer Claude Masse referred to it as the Rade de Fromentine ("Formantine harbour") .

Since July 1971, the Noirmoutier Bridge has been used to cross the strait.
