= Bay of Bourgneuf =

Coordinates: 47°2′N 2°7′W

- Bay of Brittany
- Baie de Bourgneuf (French)
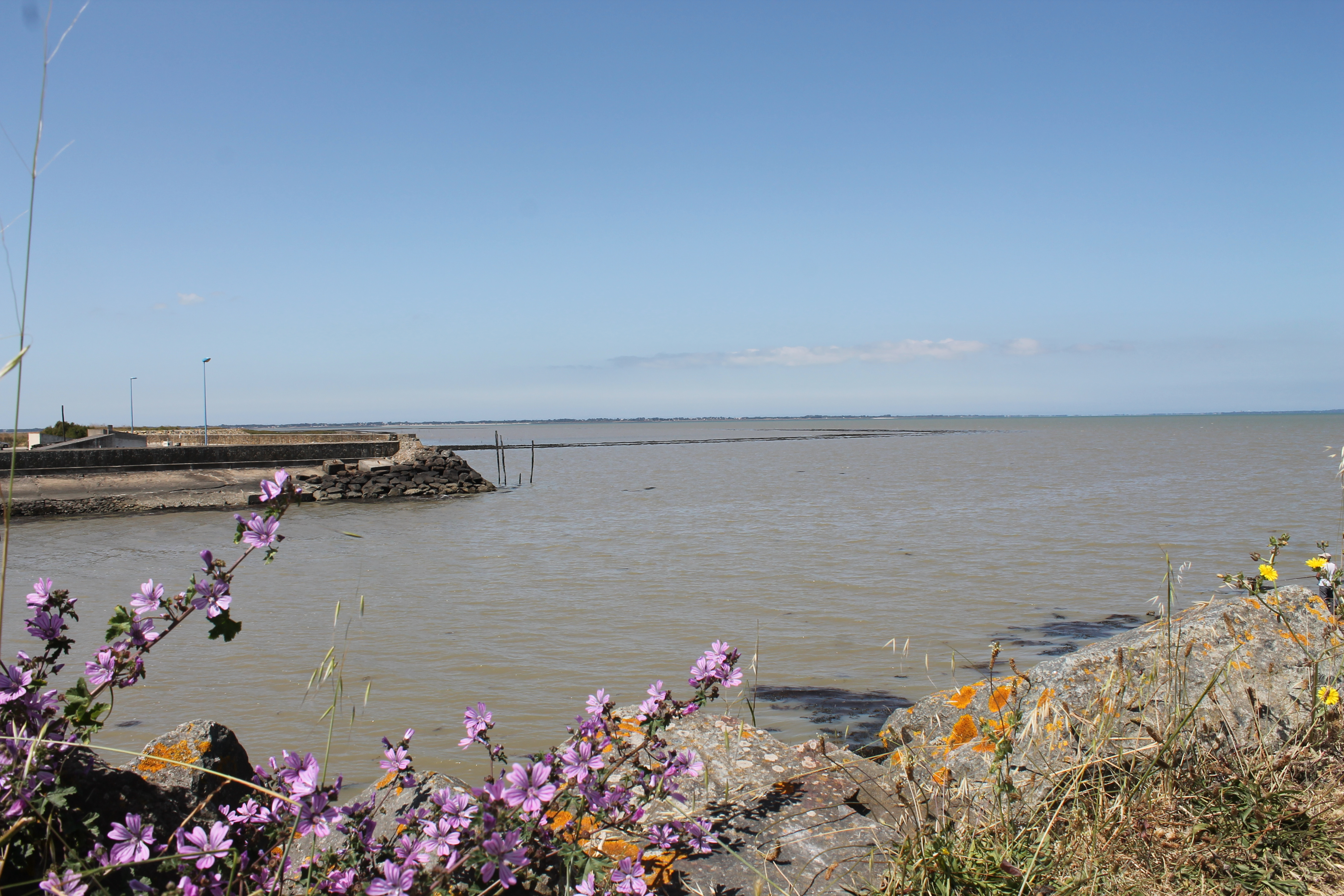
- View of the bay from the port du Bec at Bouin.

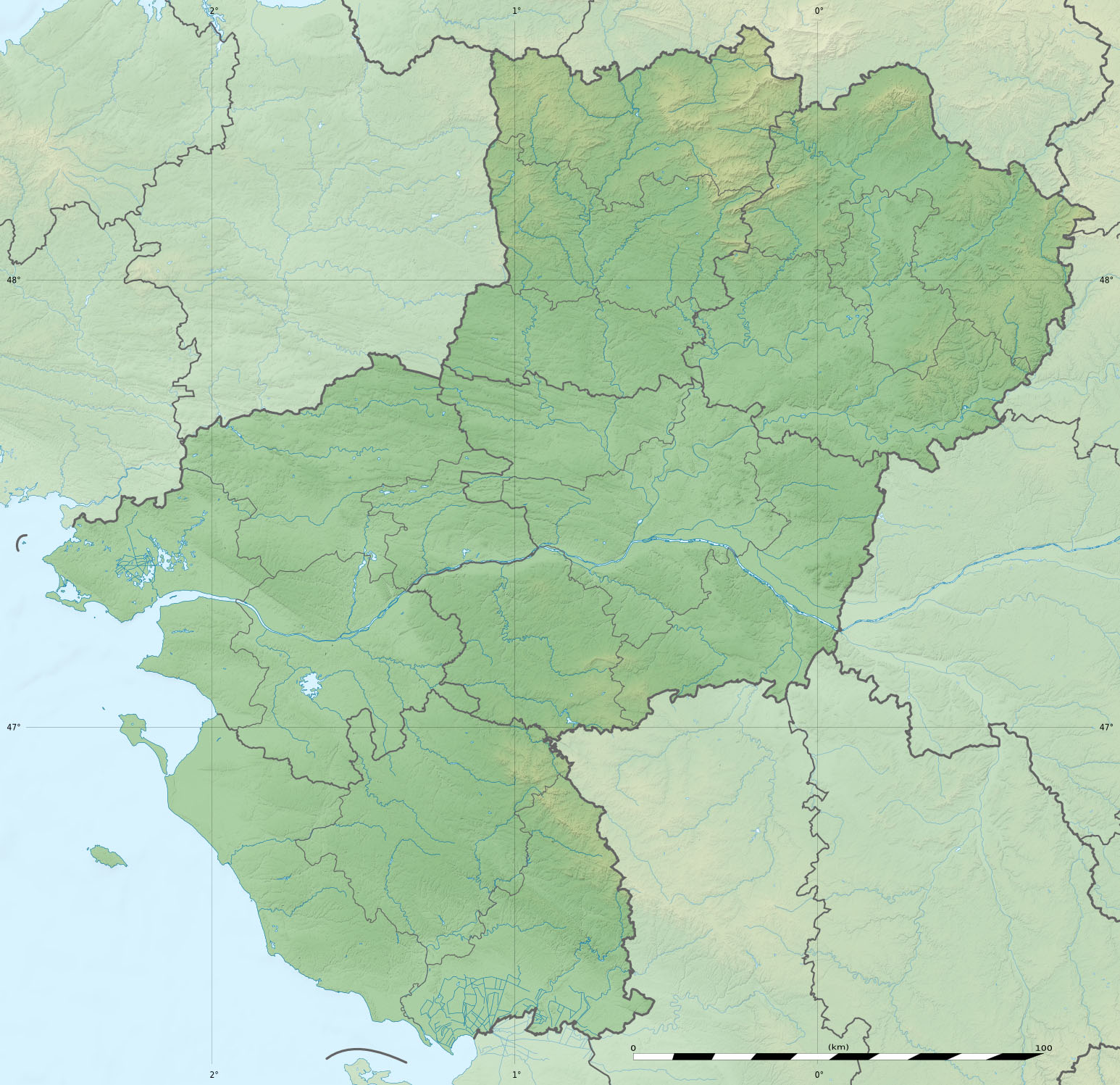
- Location within Pays de la Loire

- Bathymetric map
- Location: Pays de Retz, Loire-Atlantique, Vendée
- Type: Bay
- Part of: Bay of Biscay
- River sources: Canal de Haute Perche, Falleron
- Ocean/sea sources: Atlantic Ocean
- Basin countries: France
- Max. length: 27 km (17 mi)
- Max. width: 17 km (11 mi)
- Average depth: 10 m (33 ft)
- Max. depth: 20 m (66 ft)
- Islands: Noirmoutier

The Bay of Bourgneuf (French: Baie de Bourgneuf, French pronunciation: [bɛ də buʁnœf]; Breton: Bae Borgneuf) is a bay situated on the French Atlantic coast, at the border of the Loire-Atlantique and Vendée departments. In the Middle Ages the bay was known as the baie de Bretagne or baye de Bretagne (Bay of Brittany or Brittany Bay).

The bay of Bourgneuf is a vast maritime arc on the French Atlantic coast running from the Pointe Saint-Gildas (south of the Loire estuary) to Beauvoir-sur-Mer and is enclosed by the island of Noirmoutier up to the île du Pilier. It thus includes the south coast of the Pays de Retz, the shore of the Marais breton ('Breton Marshes') and the east coast of Noirmoutier, the latter being connected to the mainland by the notable Passage du Gois and, to the south, the bay connects to the north of the Bay of Biscay by the Strait of Fromentine, crossed by the Noirmoutier Bridge since 1971.

Until the Middle Ages the bay extended over a far greater area. Its shores reached the ports of Machecoul and Challans and was dotted with several islands, notably the Isle of Bouin. Silting of the bed of the bay followed by the creation of the polders and salt pans of the Marais Breton and Noirmoutier, significantly reducing the bay's area.

== Climate ==
The isle of Noirmoutier encloses and shelters the bay and gives it a milder climate. It shares the relatively sunny exposure of the area south of the Loire. At Moutiers-en-Retz, July and August (22 °C) are the warmest months and January (8 °C) the coldest. Summers are relatively dry. In winter, snow is infrequent as are periods of intense cold. Overall, annual sunshine is high for the region (over 2300 hours per year like in Noirmoutier) including winter. Autumns are often wet due to coastal storms, even if sunny days remain frequent. A non official temperature of 48 °C has been releved here in 18 July 2022. The climate is submediterranean in the Gaussen climate classification having one dry month (P < 2 × T). According to the Köppen climate classification, the climate is Mediterranean climate Csb.

== History ==
The Marais breton in the bay, became a major salt producer in Brittany, France and Europe in the 15th and 16th centuries. The bay bore witness to this activity, such as at the port of Collet, where ships from the Hanseatic League came to load grey salt.

The prosperity of the towns of the bay declined in the 18th century with the reduction of trade due to the silting that hampered production and the navigation of large vessels. Silting remains an ongoing issue, due mainly to alluvial sediments from the Loire to the north.

Bourgneuf en Retz, Machecoul, Challans, Beauvoir-sur-Mer, were formerly sea ports on the shores of the Bay of Bourgneuf. The limit of the ancient shoreline can be discerned today as the line of demarcation between bocage and marshland, such as the Marais Poitevin.

The 1799 Vendée earthquake, centred between Noirmouitier and Bouin in the south of the bay, estimated at force 6.5, caused widespread damage.

=== Smuggling ===
Under the Ancien Régime, this region was the centre of a significant smuggling operation operated by the coureurs de lune (moon runners) who trafficked illegal tobacco, salt, wines, liquour, and Indiennes, on foot, horseback or aboard three-masted lighters known as "chattes", constantly trying to evade capture by customs officers. This traffic was rife and directly or indirectly affected the whole population.

Smuggling was principally operated from the isles of Bouin, Noirmoutier and île d'Yeu, exacerbated by the islands' tax-exempt status at the time.

== Principal ports ==
- Pointe Saint-Gildas
- Pornic :
  - Port de la Noëveillard
  - Le Vieux-port
- Moutiers-en-Retz :
  - Port du Collet
- Bouin :
  - Port des Brochets
  - Port des Champs
  - Port du Bec
- La Barre-de-Monts :
  - Fromentine
- Noirmoutier-en-l'Île
  - Vieux port
  - L'Herbaudière

== Flora and fauna ==
According to Natura 2000, the Marais Breton forms part of a larger geographic zone which also includes the Pays-de-Monts National Forest and the island of Noirmoutier. In 2017 this zone was rated 2, wetland zone of international importance under the Ramsar Convention.

== See also ==
=== Bibliography ===
- Boutin, Émile (1 January 1993). La baie de Bretagne et sa contrebande : sel, vin, tabac, indiennes [The bay of Brittany and its contraband: salt, wine, tobacco, Indian] (in French). Siloë. ISBN 9782908924251.
- Vincent, Johan (1 July 2011). Le Passage du Gois menacé. un grand projet d'endiguement de la bai de Bourgneuf durant la Seconde Guerre mondiale [The Passage du Gois threatened. a major project to contain the Bay of Bourgneuf during the Second World War] (in French). Siloë. ISBN 978-2842315092.
- Villalobos, Carlos Alonso; Ménanteau, Loic (2006). "Paléoenvironnements et techniques de production du sel marin (par ignition ou insolation) durant l'Antiquité : les cas des baies de Bourgneuf (France) et de Cadix (Espagne)" [Paleoenvironments and sea salt production techniques (by heating or solar evapouration) during Antiquity: the cases of the bays of Bourgneuf (France) and Cadiz (Spain)]. In Hocquet, Jean-Claude; Sarrazin, Jean-Luc (eds.). Le Sel de la Baie. Histoire, archéologie, ethnologie des sels atlantiques [Salt of the Bay. History, archeology, ethnology of Atlantic salts]. Histoire (in French). Presses universitaires de Rennes. pp. 87–103. ISBN 9782753531994.

=== Related articles ===
- Pays de Retz
- Smuggling
- Bourgneuf-en-Retz
- Noirmoutier
- Côte de Jade
- Marais breton
- Passage du Gois
