= Noirmoutier Bridge =

Bridge in France

Noirmoutier Bridge Pont de Noirmoutier
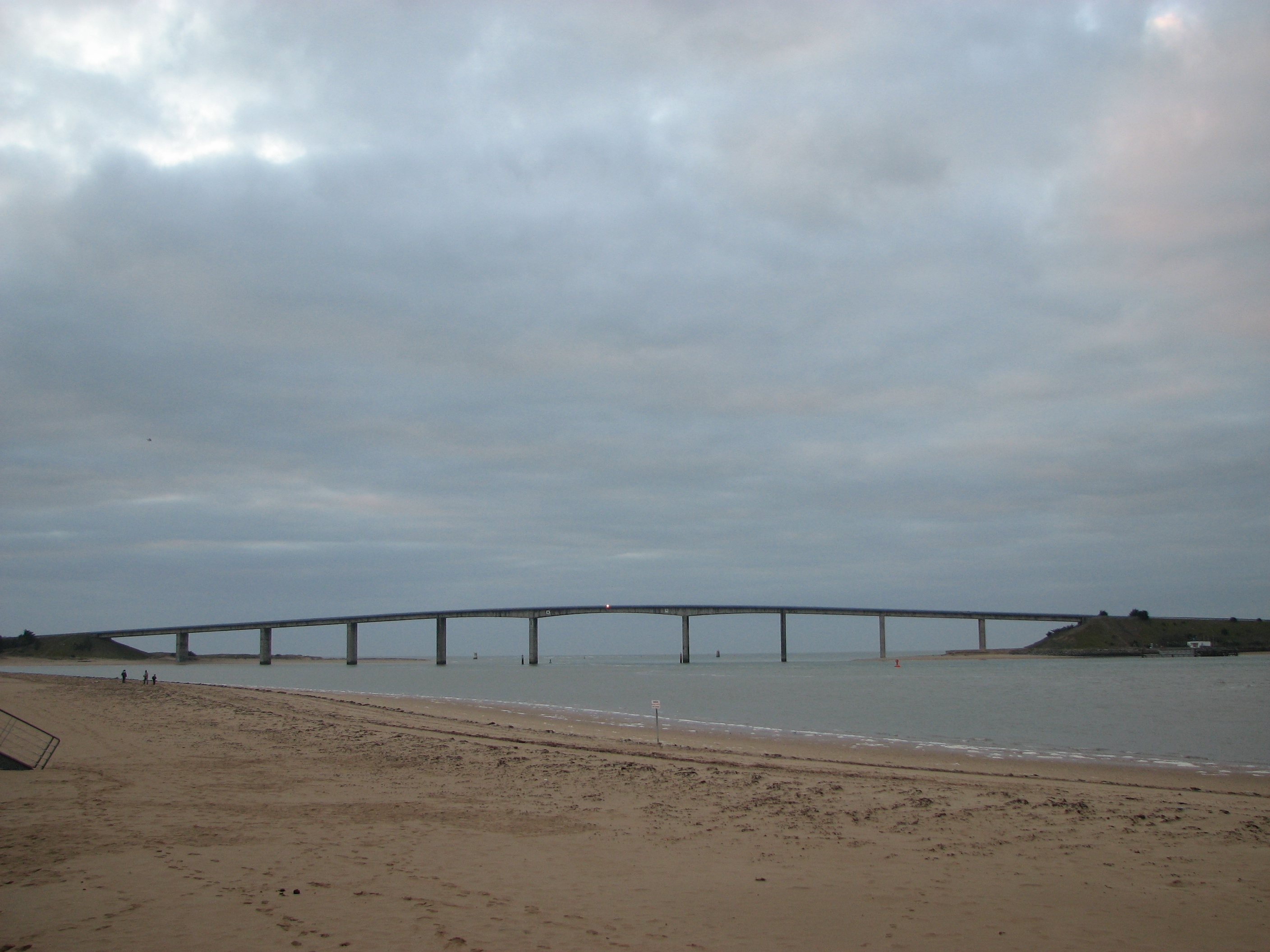
- The Noirmoutier Bridge seen from the Fromentine ferry terminal (Noirmoutier is on the right).
- Coordinates: 46°53′30″N 02°08′59″W
- Carries: Motor vehicles, pedestrians and bicycles
- Crosses: Strait of Fromentine, Bay of Biscay
- Locale: Vendée, Pays de la Loire
- Begins: La Barre-de-Monts (mainland)
- Ends: Barbâtre (island)
- Owner: Vendée Departmental Council

Characteristics
- Design: Box girder bridge
- Material: Prestressed concrete
- Trough construction: Hollow-core slab
- Total length: 583 metres (638 yd)
- Width: 13.5 metres (14.8 yd)
- Clearance above: open
- No. of lanes: 2

History
- Constructed by: Dumez and Sacer (structural work), Freyssinet International (prestressing), Bureau Veritas (testing)
- Construction start: 1969
- Construction end: 1971
- Opened: 7 July 1971
- Inaugurated: 7 July 1971
- Replaces: ferry service

Statistics
- Toll: removed 1 July 1994

Location
- Interactive map of Noirmoutier Bridge

The Noirmoutier Bridge (French: Pont de Noirmoutier) is a bridge located on the west coast of France in the department of Vendée, built in the early 1970s to connect the island of Noirmoutier to the mainland. Before it opened, a maritime shuttle service ran between the La Fosse pier on the island and Fromentine pier on the mainland.

== Description ==
The bridge connects the towns of Barbâtre, on the south of the island of Noirmoutier, to La Barre-de-Monts, on the north-Vendée mainland coast, and crosses the Strait of Fromentine. Built by the Dumez and Sacer companies under the project management and financial direction of the department, its first stone was laid on 12 May 1969 in Fromentine and it was opened to traffic on 7 July 1971, in order to provide a replacement for the passage du Gois (a submersible roadway at high tide). An enamel plaque was placed at the top against the railing to recall the event.

In 1977, an increase in the toll rate led to demonstrations by island users, with traffic blockading the entrances to the bridge, raising of barricades and the intervention of a company of CRS in response. The toll was removed from 1 July 1994.

After an appraisal carried out in 2016, restoration work aimed in particular at a better waterproofing of the concrete has been carried out since 2017.

== Technical characteristics ==
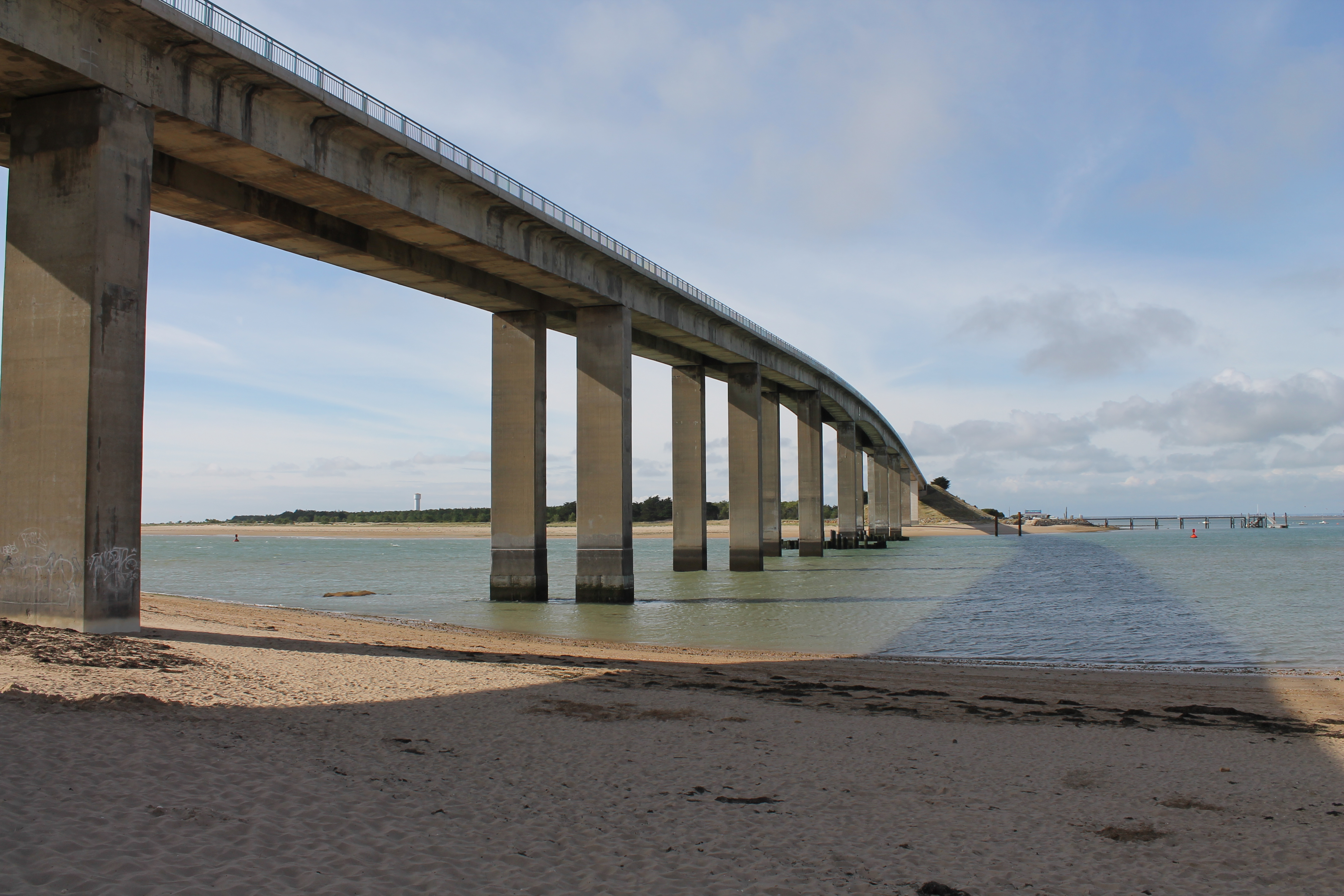
The bridge from one of the beaches of La Barre-de-Monts.

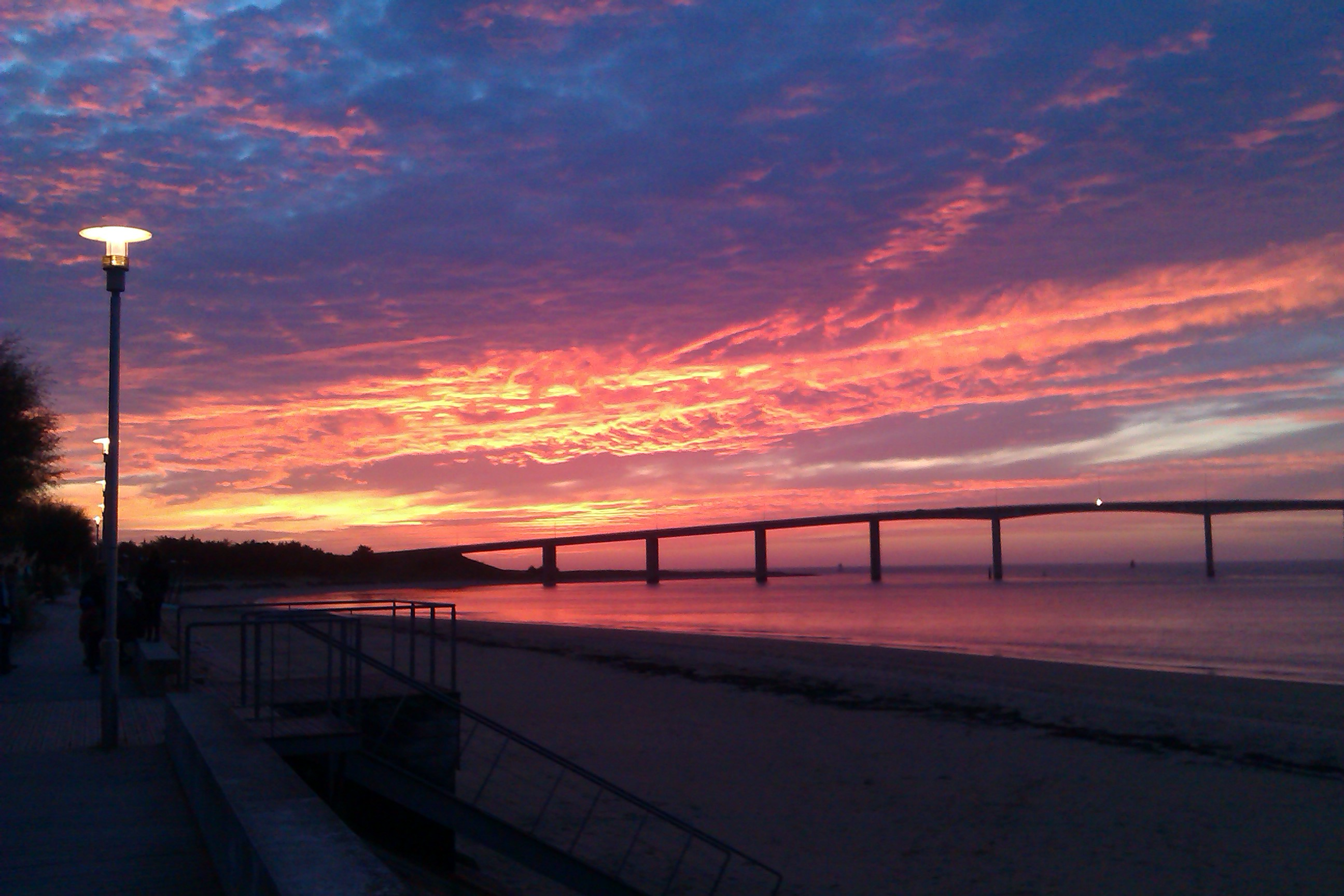
View from Fromentine.

The technical characteristics of the Noirmoutier bridge are as follows:

- Total length: 583 m (1,913 ft)
- Main central span: 88 m (289 ft)
- Deck width: 13.50 m (44.3 ft)
- Height under main apron: 24 m (79 ft)
- Mainland access viaduct: 4 continuous spans with a span of 55 m (180 ft)
- Main viaduct: 3 continuous spans 55–88–55 m (180–289–180 ft)
- Access viaduct on the island side: 3 continuous spans with a span of 55 m (180 ft).

The deck is made up of two box girders assembled in prestressed concrete 3.80 m (12.5 ft) wide with 1.32 m (4 ft 4 in) cantilevers. These two prefabricated caissons are connected by a slab poured in place 0.80 m (2 ft 7 in) wide.

The piles are largely based in the ground, to rest on solid ground. The foundations are approximately double the visible height of the piers. These are hollow, except those of the central bay, in anticipation of possible collisions with boats.

The construction was carried out by assembling the segments using a launching gantry making it possible to pose the corbelling symmetrically on each side of the supports. The 258 prefabricated segments unit weight is approximately 50 tonnes.

The manufacture of the piers used 4,000 m^{3} (140,000 cu ft) of concrete, 13,500 m^{2} (145,000 sq ft) of formwork and 250 tonnes of high-grade steel. The deck required 4,500 m^{3} (160,000 cu ft) of concrete, 160 tonnes of reinforced concrete steel and 180 tonnes of steel cables for the prestressing.
