= Pays-de-Monts National Forest =

Forest in France

Pays-de-Monts National Forest French: Forêt dominale des Pays-de-Monts
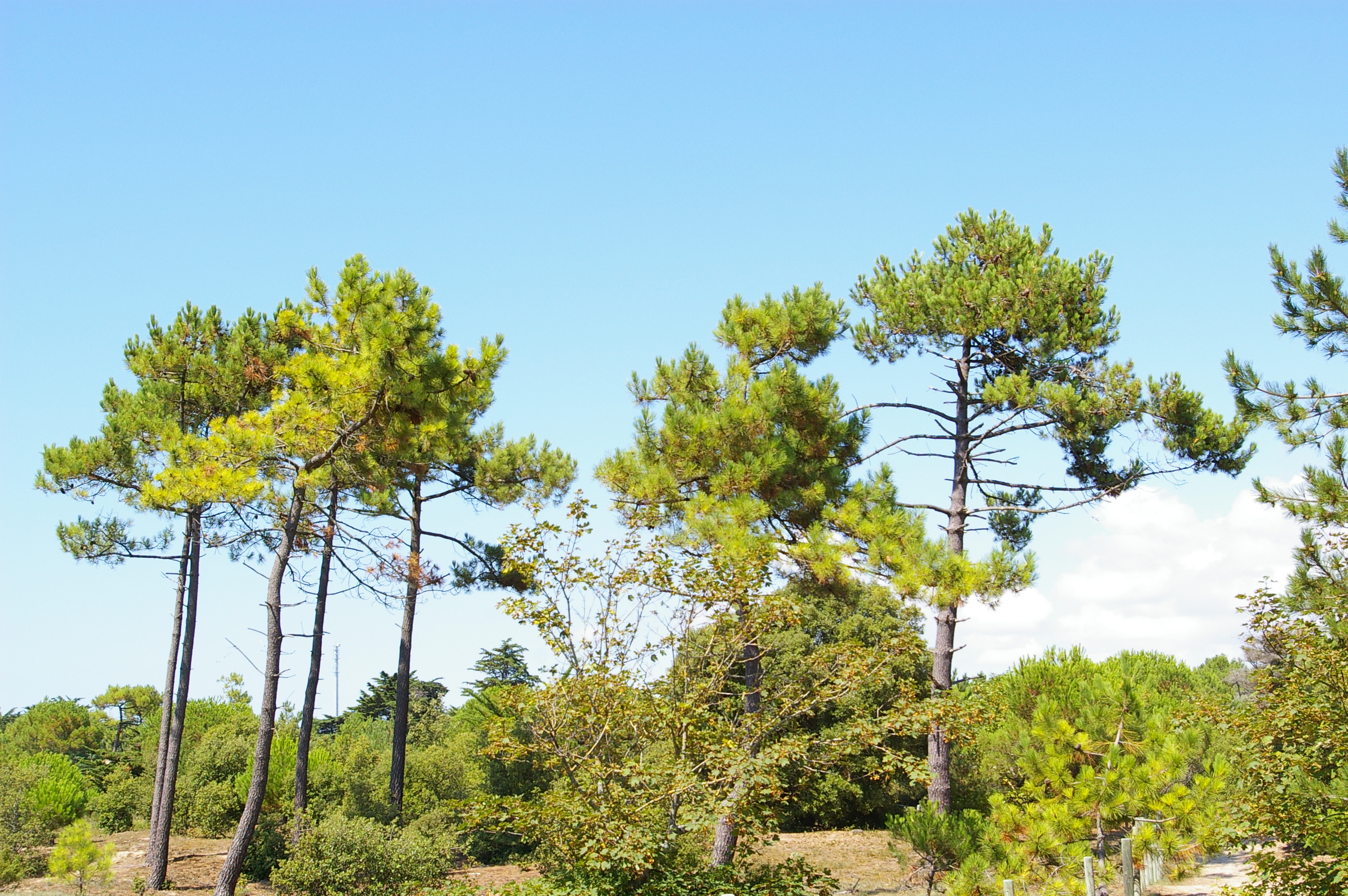
- The forest at Saint-Jean-de-Monts.

- Location within France

Geography
- Location: Vendée, Pays de la Loire, France
- Coordinates: 46°43′51″N 1°59′04″W
- Elevation: 0–20 metres
- Area: 2,280 hectares (5,600 acres)

Administration
- Authority: National Forests Office (France)

Ecology
- Forest cover: pine
- Dominant tree species: Pinus pinaster Aiton

The Pays-de-Monts national forest (French: Forêt domaniale des Pays-de-Monts), also known as the Monts forest (French: forêt de Monts), is a French national forest (French: forêt domaniale) stretching over the dunes of the northern Vendée coast.

== Description ==
25 km long between Fromentine (municipality of La Barre-de-Monts) to the north and Sion-sur-l'Océan (municipality of Saint-Hilaire-de-Riez) to the south, its width does not exceed 2.3 kilometres (1.4 miles). It has a total area of 2,280 hectares (5,600 acres) - La Barre-de-Monts alone totals 600 hectares (1,500 acres) hectares, making it the largest forest area on the Vendée coast. It also impacts on the town planning of coastal municipalities such as those of Saint-Jean-de-Monts and Notre-Dame-de-Monts by separating the waterfronts from their town centres with wooded avenues forming a "greenway" of a hundred meters width. Its altitude ranges from sea-level of the bordering coasts and marshes to a high point of 20m at the Pic de la Blet near La Barre-de-Monts.

== History ==
The national forest of Pays-de-Monts was planted at the end of the 19th century under the Second Empire as part of a broader process of fixing the dunes and draining the marshes for cultivation.

== Tree species ==
The predominant tree species of the forest is the maritime pine which covers 75% of the forest but is however now experiencing a real decline. Other tree species include stone pine, Corsican black pine (Pinus nigra var. corsicana), holm oak, and Montpellier maple.

== Environment ==
According to Natura 2000, the forest is part of a larger geographical framework also encompassing the marshes of the Marais Breton, the Bay of Bourgneuf, and the island of Noirmoutier.

This same geographical area was designated on February 2, 2017 as a Wetland of International Importance under the Ramsar Convention.
