= Foulées du Gois =

Annual road running race held on the Passage du Gois tidal causeway in France

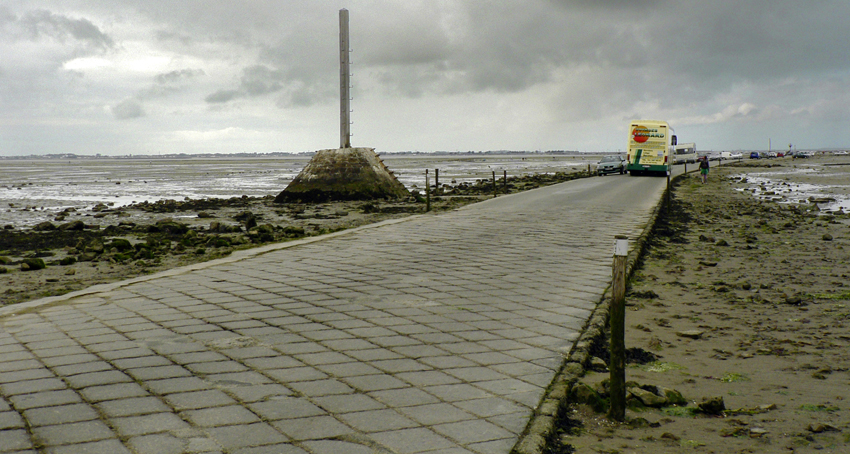
The Passage du Gois.

The Foulées du Gois (French pronunciation: [fule dy ɡwa]) is an international road running race held annually on the Passage du Gois, a tidal causeway between Beauvoir-sur-Mer and the Île de Noirmoutier, France. The professional race, held over the submerged causeway, is from one end of the causeway to the other, a distance of 4.15 kilometres (2.58 mi). A series of alternate races are undertaken earlier in the day, when the tide is not over the causeway, for youth and non-professional divisions; the adult non-elite divisions are 8.3 kilometres (5.2 mi) in length, a round trip of the Passage du Gois. The event is the second-most publicised in the département of Vendée (85), after the Vendée Globe round-the-world yacht race.

== Racing history and records ==
The idea for a race on the Passage du Gois was conceived in the late stages of 1986, with Jo Cesbron the founding president of the 'Foulées du Gois'. The first event was held on June 20, 1987. The race takes place annually in early summer, most frequently in the month of June, due to the logistics of tide heights, daylight hours, and water temperatures; the race generally starts in the evening.

The professional race, which is limited to 30 competitors selected from French and international applicants, begins when the water first crosses the road. The leaders often finish with water up to their ankles, while those who have got caught in the rising swell are often forced to swim to the finish line. The current record for the race is 12 minutes and 8 seconds, by French athlete and Olympian Dominique Chauvelier in the 1990 running of the event.

== Conditions and geography ==
The Passage du Gois is at the convergence point of two water currents; the Bay of Bourgneuf current to the left of the runners and the Fromentine current to right. The athletes use the wave caused by this meeting as a path, as it provides less resistance to wading compared to undisturbed water. However, at high tide, the Bay of Bourgneuf current is stronger than the Fromentine current, and the wave line alters its course off the causeway. The height of the water at high tide varies between 1.3 metres (4.3 ft) and 4.0 metres (13.1 ft).
