= Delafosse =

Delafosse or Delafose is a French surname. Notable people with this name include:

- Gabriel Delafosse (1796–1878), French mineralogist
- Geno Delafose (born 1972), American Zydeco musician, son of John Delafose
- John Delafose (1939–1994), American Zydeco musician
- Maurice Delafosse (1870–1926), French ethnographer and colonial official

== See also ==
- De la Fosse
