= Antoine de La Fosse =

French playwright

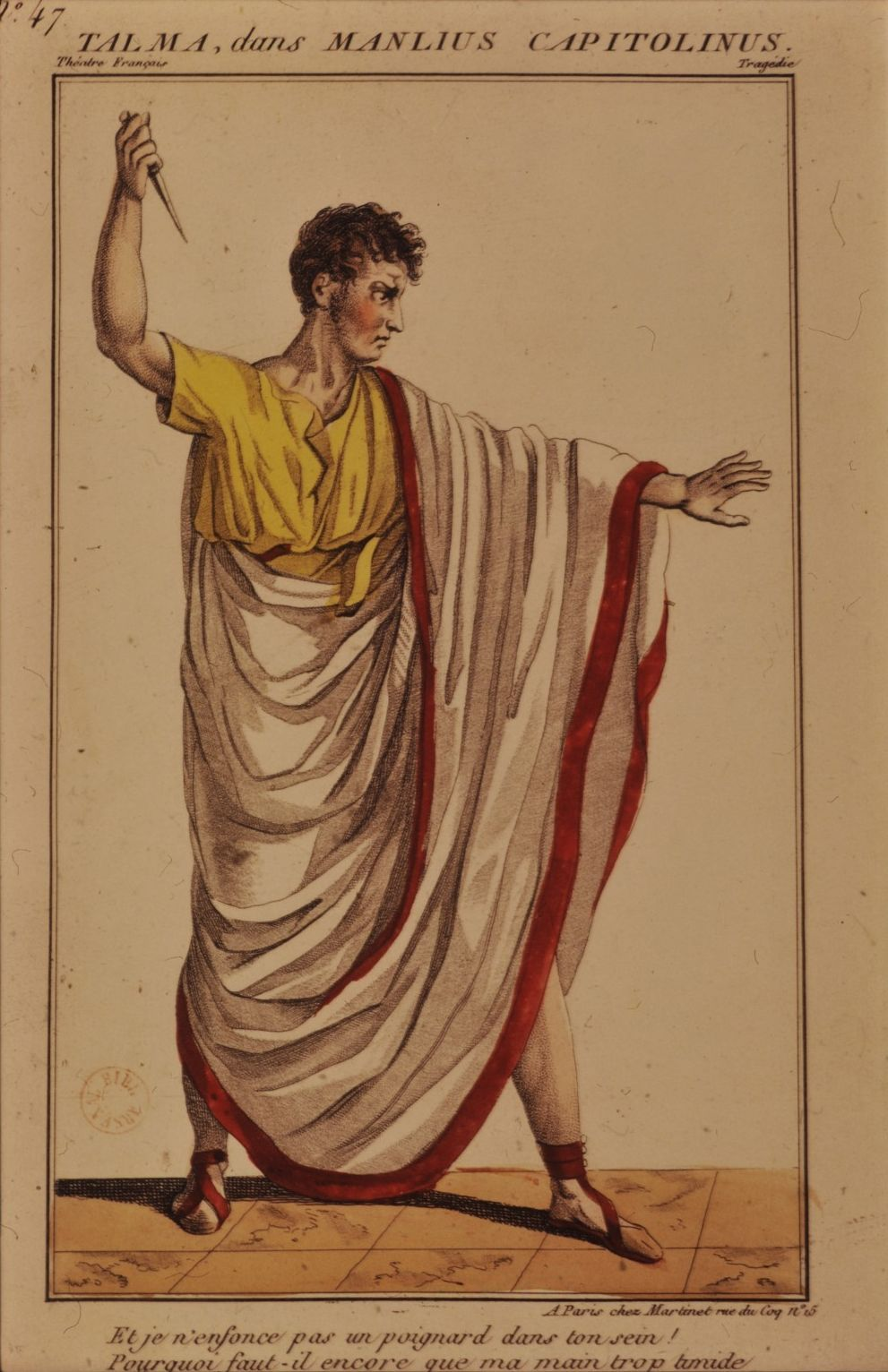
François-Joseph Talma in Manlius Capitolinus at Comédie-Française, 1806

Antoine de La Fosse (alias Sieur d'Aubigny; 1653 or 1658 – 2 November 1708) Premier gentilhomme de la Chambre, was a French playwright who wrote four tragedies, and was the last French author of tragedies to make a name for himself at the end of the 17th century.

The son of a goldsmith and the nephew of painter Charles de La Fosse, Antoine served first as the secretary for the Envoy of France to Florence. La Fosse was then attached to Marquis Francois Joseph Créquy (1662–1702) who died in the Battle of Luzzara on 15 August 1702, before he became secretary for the 2nd Duke of Aumont Louis-Marie-Victor d'Aumont (1632–1704).

La Fosse translated the odes of Anacreon to French (Traduction nouvelle des odes d'Anacreon, sur l'original grec) in 1704, and popular with contemporaries the second edition was published in 1706. German classicist Johann Friedrich Christ (1701–1756) praised the French verse translation.

La Fosse's chef d'œuvre Manlius Capitolinus (1698) about Marcus Manlius Capitolinus (died 384 BCE), was imitated from the English dramatist Thomas Otway's play Venice Preserv'd, who in turn had taken his plot from César Vichard de Saint-Réal's Conjuration des Espagnols contre la République de Venise en l'Année M. DC. XVIII (1674). La Fosse's later plays were not as successful, but according to theater historian Phyllis Hartnoll in The Oxford Companion to the Theatre, many of his contemporaries thought he might have rivalled Jean Racine had he began his dramatic career earlier.

His collected plays were popular for more than a century and were re-published multiple times in the 18th and 19th century, e.g. in two quarto volumes in 1747 (Nouvelle edition - "new edition"), and in 1811 in two octavo volumes.

Among his other works of elegies, odes, epigrams, poems, and cantatas is an ode written in Italian, a language he became fluent in while in Florence, which earned him a membership of Accademia degli Apatisti.

La Fosse is interred in St-Gervais-et-St-Protais, Paris.

== Selected works ==
- Antoine de La Fosse (1747). Les oeuvres de Monsieur de La Fosse, nouvelle édition, revûe corrigée & augmentée de ses Poésies diverses. Tome premier. Compagnie des Libraires Associés.
- Antoine de La Fosse (1747). Les oeuvres de Monsieur de La Fosse, nouvelle édition, revûe corrigée & augmentée de ses Poésies diverses. Tome second. Compagnie des Libraires Associés.

=== Plays ===
- Polyxène (premiere February 3, 1686)
- Manlius Capitolinus (premiere January 18, 1698)
- Thesée (premiere 5 January 1700)
- Corésus Callirhoé (premiere December 7, 1703)
