= De la Fosse =

De la Fosse is a surname of French origin, and may refer to:

- Antoine de La Fosse (c. 1653–1708), French playwright
- Charles de La Fosse (1636–1716), French painter, uncle to Antoine
- Charles-Alexandre Coëssin de la Fosse (1829–1910), French painter and engraver
- Eustache de la Fosse (c. 1451–1523), Flemish-speaking sailor
- Louis Remy de la Fosse (c. 1659–1726), French architect

== See also ==
- Arboretum de la Fosse in Fontaine-les-Coteaux, France
- Delafosse
