= Noirmoutier =

Island off the coast of Vendée, France

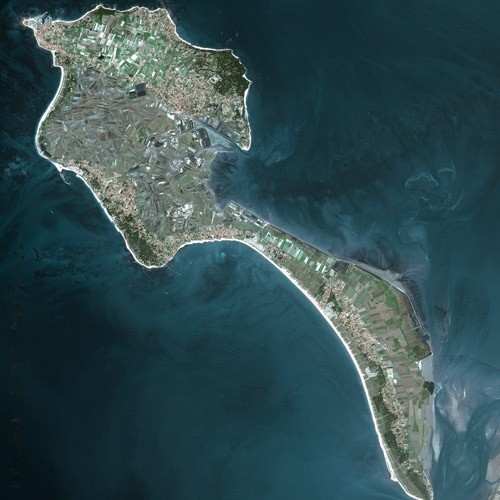
- Noirmoutier Island image from satellite Spot

- Location within France

Geography
- Location: Atlantic Ocean
- Coordinates: 46°58′N 2°13′W
- Area: 49 km^{2} (19 sq mi)
- Length: 19 km (11.8 mi)
- Width: 6 km (3.7 mi)
- Highest elevation: 20 m (70 ft)
- Highest point: No named

Administration
- France
- Region: Pays de la Loire
- Department: Vendée
- Arrondissement: Les Sables-d'Olonne

Demographics
- Population: 9,590
- Pop. density: 195.76/km^{2} (507.02/sq mi)
- Ethnic groups: French people

Ramsar Wetland
- Official name: Marais Breton, Baie de Bourgneuf, Ile de Noirmoutier et Forêt de Monts
- Designated: 2 February 2017
- Reference no.: 2283

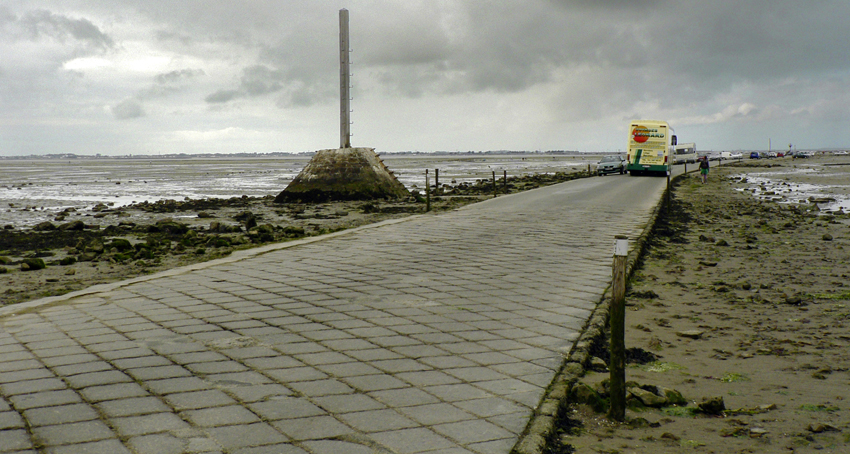
The Passage du Gois leading to the island of Noirmoutier.

Noirmoutier (also French: Île de Noirmoutier, pronounced [nwaʁmutje]; Breton: Nervouster, Nermouster) is a tidal island off the Atlantic coast of France in the Vendée department (85).

== History ==
A dolmen, several menhirs, and the ruins of a Gallo-Roman villa with its hot baths show that the island must have been occupied at an early date; but the first fact in its recorded history is the foundation of the Benedictine monastery of "Her" by St. Philibert about 680. From this monastery the name Noirmoutier (Heri monasterium, Hermoutier) is derived.

Noirmoutier was the location of an early Viking raid in 799, when raiders attacked Noirmoutier Abbey founded by Saint Philibert of Jumièges.

The Vikings established a permanent base on the island around 824, from which they could control southeast Brittany by the 840s. In 848, they sacked Bordeaux. From 862 until 882, Hastein used it as a base from which he raided Francia and Brittany.

In 1205 the abbey of Notre Dame la Blanche was built at the north extremity of the island to take the place of a Cistercian convent established in the Île du Pilier, at that time attached to Noirmoutier by a dyke. This abbey was ruined by the Protestants in 1562. In the 15th, 16th and 17th centuries the island belonged to the La Trémoille family, and in 1650 the territory was made a duchy.

On 4 July 1674, during the Franco-Dutch War, the island was briefly captured by Dutch forces under the command of Cornelis Tromp. The Dutch flag flew from the walls on the island for nearly three weeks until, on 23 July, the Dutch abandoned it after blowing up the castle and demolishing the coastal batteries.

Noirmoutier was the site of several campaigns in the War of the Vendée, as well as a massacre and the place of execution of the Royalist Generalissimo Maurice D'Elbée, who faced the firing squad seated in a chair due to wounds accumulated from an earlier battle.

St. Mary Euphrasia Pelletier was born on this island on 31 July 1796.

== Geography ==
The island comprises ten localities and four distinct communes. Its length is approximately 25 kilometres (16 mi), and its width varies from 500 metres (1,600 ft) to 15 kilometres (9.3 mi). Its area of 4,877 hectares (12,050 acres; 48.77 km^{2}; 18.83 sq mi).

Noirmoutier appears to be formed of alluvial deposits gradually accumulated around a rock of no great size situated at the meeting-place of the Gascony and Brittany currents. It is referred to as the Island of Mimosas, due to the temperateness of its climate, which allows for the flowering of Acacia dealbata (mimosa) year-round. The island is predominantly salt marsh and salt banks, sand dunes and evergreen oak forests.

The communes of the island are grouped into a communauté de communes. The communes are:

- Barbâtre
- L'Épine
- La Guérinière
- Noirmoutier-en-l'Île

The island has been a site of uninterrupted human habitation since prehistoric times, and is a popular tourist destination.

Parts of the island have been reclaimed from the sea. In 2005 it served as the finish of the Tour de France prologue.

=== Climate ===
Noirmoutier experiences an oceanic climate typical of the west coast of France. Both the winters and summers are heavily moderated by the surrounding Atlantic Ocean. There is a low degree of diurnal temperature variation throughout the year, especially in the winter. There is considerably more precipitation in winter compared to summer. The climate is classified as cool dry summer Mediterranean type (Csb), with 3 months with Tm*2>=P. More than 2300h of sun is too high for a typical oceanic climate.

Climate data for Noirmoutier Island, Vendée
Month	Jan	Feb	Mar	Apr	May	Jun	Jul	Aug	Sep	Oct	Nov	Dec	Year
Record high °C (°F)	16.9 (62.4)	17.5 (63.5)	22.9 (73.2)	27.5 (81.5)	31.3 (88.3)	36.0 (96.8)	37.0 (98.6)	37.0 (98.6)	33.0 (91.4)	27.1 (80.8)	20.5 (68.9)	16.1 (61.0)	37.0 (98.6)
Mean daily maximum °C (°F)	9.3 (48.7)	9.8 (49.6)	12.5 (54.5)	14.9 (58.8)	18.4 (65.1)	21.5 (70.7)	23.4 (74.1)	23.5 (74.3)	21.4 (70.5)	17.4 (63.3)	12.9 (55.2)	9.9 (49.8)	16.2 (61.2)
Mean daily minimum °C (°F)	4.7 (40.5)	4.5 (40.1)	6.4 (43.5)	8.0 (46.4)	11.3 (52.3)	13.9 (57.0)	15.7 (60.3)	15.8 (60.4)	13.9 (57.0)	11.5 (52.7)	7.7 (45.9)	5.2 (41.4)	9.9 (49.8)
Record low °C (°F)	−10.0 (14.0)	−7.7 (18.1)	−6.0 (21.2)	0.0 (32.0)	0.5 (32.9)	6.0 (42.8)	10.4 (50.7)	9.5 (49.1)	7.0 (44.6)	1.7 (35.1)	−4.0 (24.8)	−8.0 (17.6)	−10.0 (14.0)
Average precipitation mm (inches)	70.1 (2.76)	56.6 (2.23)	49.4 (1.94)	52.1 (2.05)	52.2 (2.06)	34.2 (1.35)	38.6 (1.52)	31.5 (1.24)	56.9 (2.24)	85.2 (3.35)	80.9 (3.19)	78.4 (3.09)	686.1 (27.02)
Average precipitation days	12	10	10	10	9	7	6	6	9	12	12	13	116
Mean monthly sunshine hours	87	136	182	226	255	291	274	259	233	149	107	112	2,311
Source: Météo France (1981–2010; extremes since 1959).

== Transport ==
The island can be accessed via the Passage du Gois, a paved-over sandbank with a length of 4.5 kilometres (2.8 mi), one of the routes that connect the island to the mainland. It is flooded twice a day by the high tide. Until the early 1970s, a ferry service operated across the Strait of Fromentine between the La Fosse pier on the island and Fromentine pier on the mainland. This was superseded by the construction of the Noirmoutier Bridge, inaugurated in July 1971.

== Events ==
Every year, an international foot race, the Foulées du Gois, is held across it, starting at the onset of the high tide.

La "Fête de la Bonnotte" (Bonnotte party) is also an annual festival celebrating the first day of potato harvest on the island of Noirmoutier.

== Infrastructure ==
In response to an effort by the French government to add offshore wind projects to the national grid, a 496 MW wind farm is being developed near the island, with a planned commissioning date of 2021.
