= Sion-sur-l'Océan =

Village in Vendée, France

Coordinates: 46.7219°N 1.9442°W

- village and seaside resort
- Interactive map of Sion-sur-l'Océan
- Country: France
- Region: Pays de la Loire
- Website: www.sainthilairederiez.fr

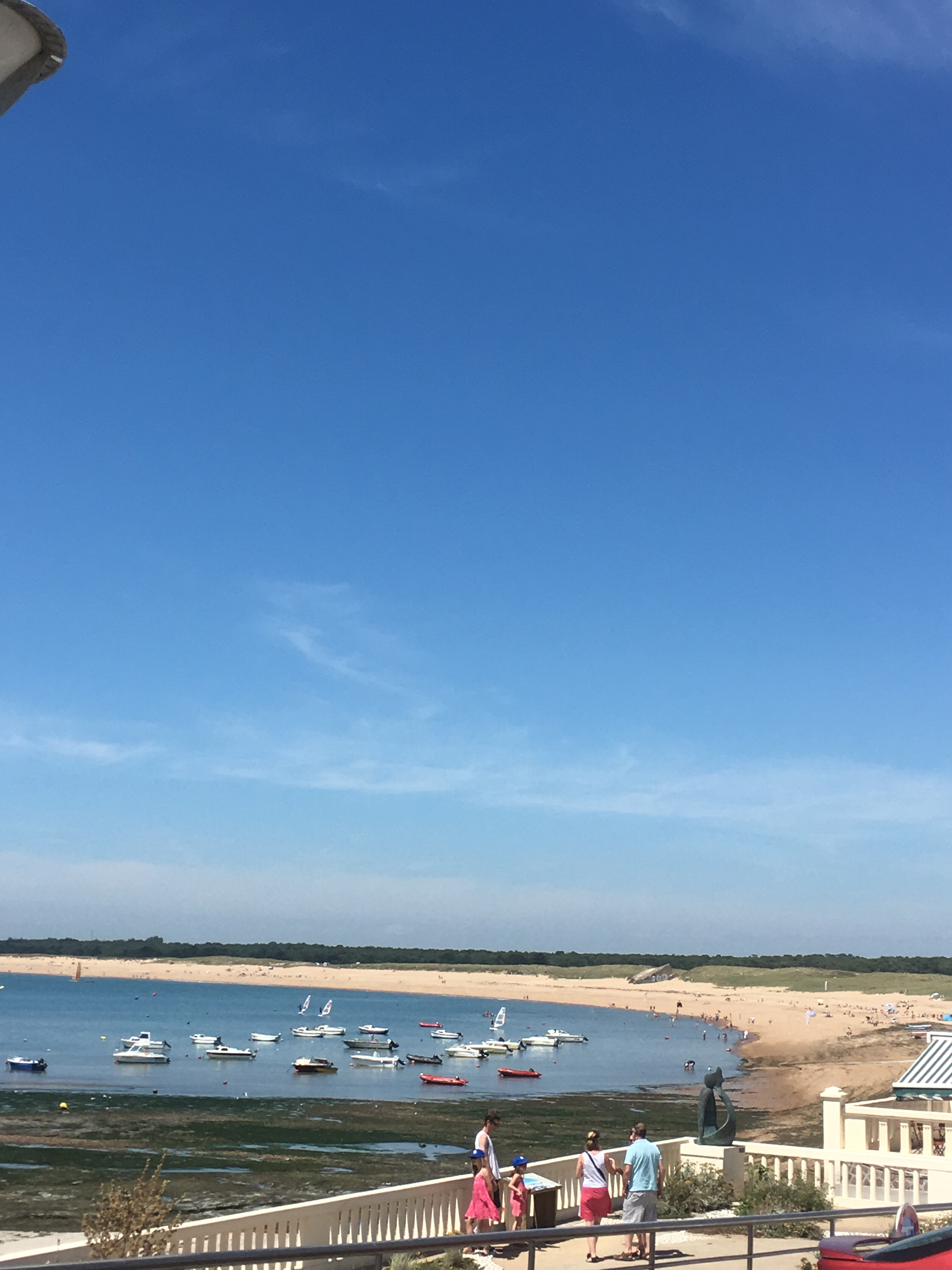
beach of Sion

Sion-sur-l'Océan (French pronunciation: [sjɔ̃ syʁ lɔseɑ̃], literally Sion on the Ocean) is a village and seaside resort in the Vendée department in western France. Sion is on the coast of the Atlantic Ocean in front of the island of Yeu (Île d'Yeu). Sion-sur-l'Océan is part of the commune of Saint-Hilaire-de-Riez.

== Geography ==
Sion is located on the coast between ocean, beach, dune, forest and rocky ledge.

The resort has three beaches (Bussoleries, the small beach and the grand beach) and a few cracks visible at low tide. The main beach is made of fine sand and stretches over 10 km (continuing by the "plages des demoiselles " in Saint Jean de Monts). The footpath dunes between sea and is 9 km to St Jean de Monts.

The main beach is lined with white dunes made of fine sand, which quickly leaves the room for a gray dune flatter and covered with varied plants (immortal, Ephedra distachya, burnet rose, sedum, etc.).

Behind the dunes, Sion forest extends over 500 hectares of forest landscaped with numerous hiking trails. The forest was once dotted with campsites and especially summer camps. These colonies were for most establishment managed by the "red municipalities" (communists) in the Paris suburbs. There are now 3 or 4 in activity, some "remnants" of the old facilities are still visible in the forest. A monument to the rail worker died for France during the 39-45 war was erected on top of a dune. This forest of cypresses, pines and oaks covers many dunes giving it an undulating appearance. It has undulating layout of views with orientation tables overlooking the forests.

The rocky ledge of Sion is walkable and has attractions such as "5 Pineaux" and "Devil's Hole." Opposite to the forest is an urbanized area with constructed pre-war villas and modern houses and buildings of 70/80 years.

Popular for its panoramic view of the Bay of Sion is on this part of the city that house prices are highest. The area of the village is in full redesign with the development of a major infrastructure project on the scale of the town: thalassotherapy.

Sion-sur-Ocean is facing the island of Yeu which more or less we see the coast on the horizon depending on the moisture in the air. The night of the two headlights of Yeu island are visible. The "skyline" of the town of Saint Jean de Monts is also visible north of Sion.

== History ==
The creation of the Village of Sion is mainly the work of Baranger family. In 1871, Jean-Marie Baranger (a seafarer from the Hamlet Orouet) takes possession of the piece of land on the coast, which today includes the center and its shops. Later, he will give up to the city space to build roads (rue de l'Yser, promenade and Sea Street Estivants). Generation by generation the initial field will be divided. The family Baranger will be at the initiative of opening shops for the tourist development of the town, such as restaurants and hotels, but also bars, a grocery, a hairdresser, a souvenir shop and a store repairing and selling bicycles. 150 years later, it is still his great-grandchildren who take certain businesses from the town (Hotel of Tourists, grocery store, restaurant le carré, hairdressing Baranger).

== Sports and tourism ==
Many water activities can be practiced, such as sailing, canoeing, surfing, and kiting. The environment is conducive to walking, riding, canoeing, and cycling.

There are numerous food and housing accommodations. The Sion neighborhood has made the town of Saint-Hilaire-de-Riez one of the popular cities of Vendée for tourism. Between sea, forest and dunes, Sion Ocean has the charm of an authentic old fishing port.

Every summer, the fireworks fired from the sea attracts thousands of people (50,000 in 2016).
