= Passage du Gois =

Causeway on the western Atlantic coast of France

Coordinates: 46°55′51″N 2°07′34″W

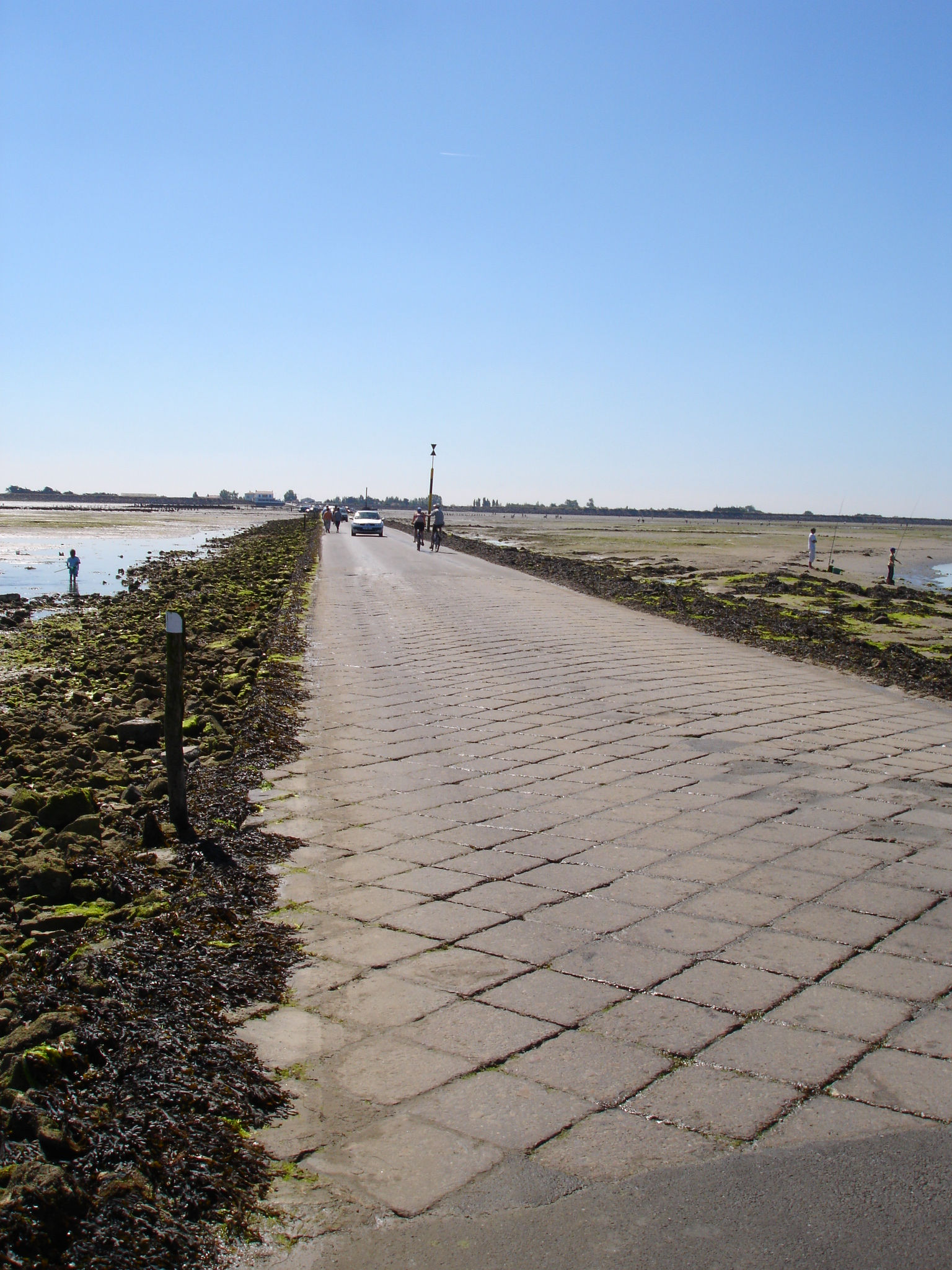
The Passage du Gois

The Passage du Gois (French pronunciation: [pasaʒ dy ɡwa]) or Gôa is a causeway between Beauvoir-sur-Mer and the island of Noirmoutier, in Vendée, on the Atlantic coast of France. It is 4.125 kilometres (2.6 mi) long and floods twice a day during high tide. A road runs along the causeway.

Every year, a foot race—the Foulées du Gois—is held across it, starting at the onset of low tide, though professional athletes hold off until the water is as high as their shoes.

== Tour de France ==
The Passage du Gois was used in the second stage of the 1999 Tour de France bicycle race, though it proved to be divisive due to a crash caused by the slippery surface. The crash created a six-minute split in the peloton, which ended the hopes of many favourites to win the race, including Alex Zülle, who would eventually finish second overall.

The causeway was used again in the 2011 race, as the starting point of the first stage.

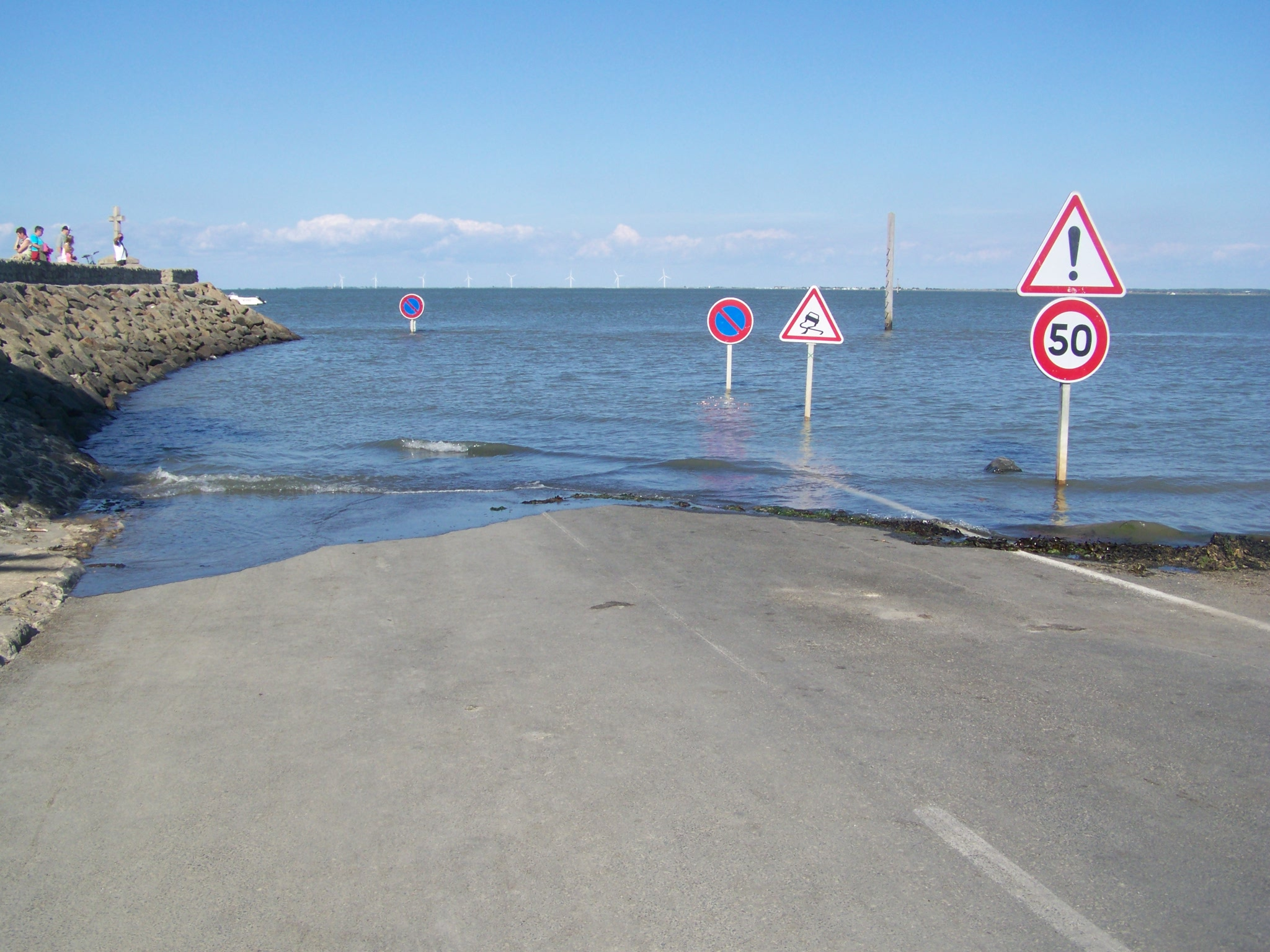
Flooded causeway (island side)

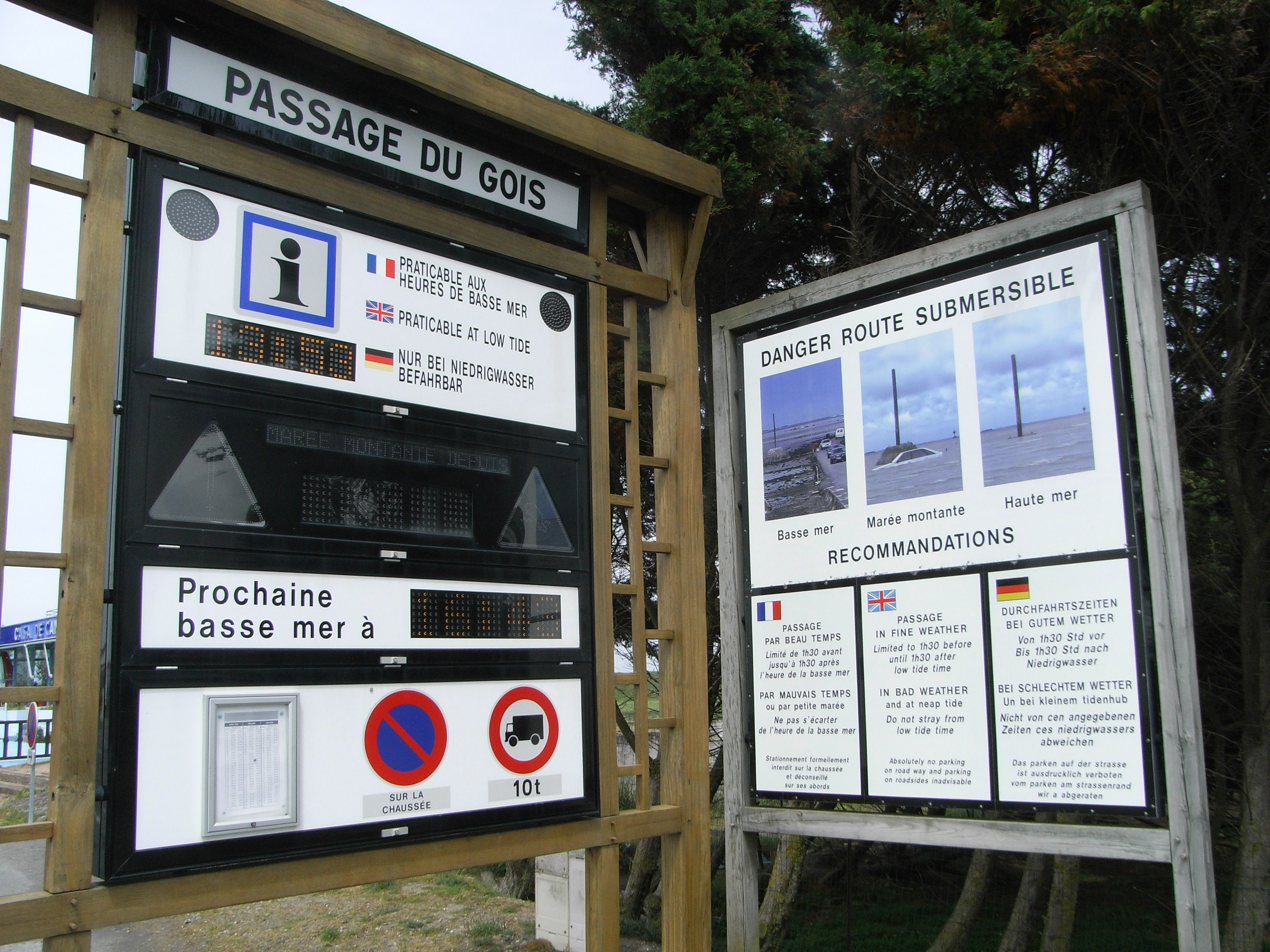
Tide tables

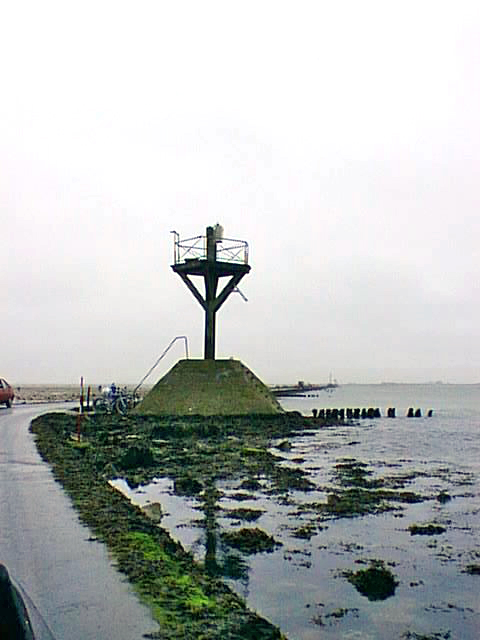
Beacon

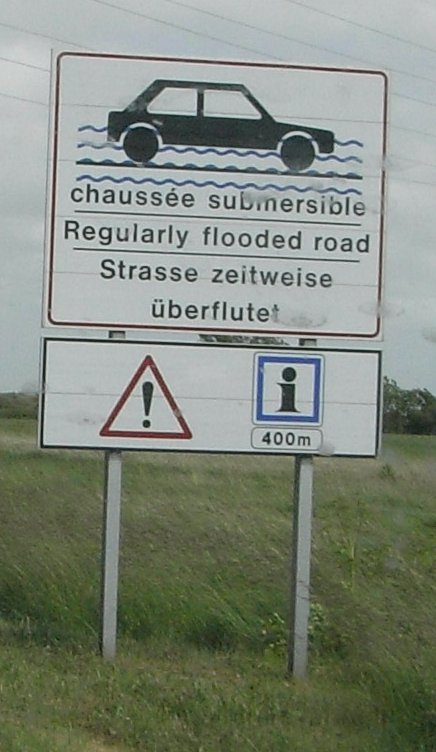
Warning notice

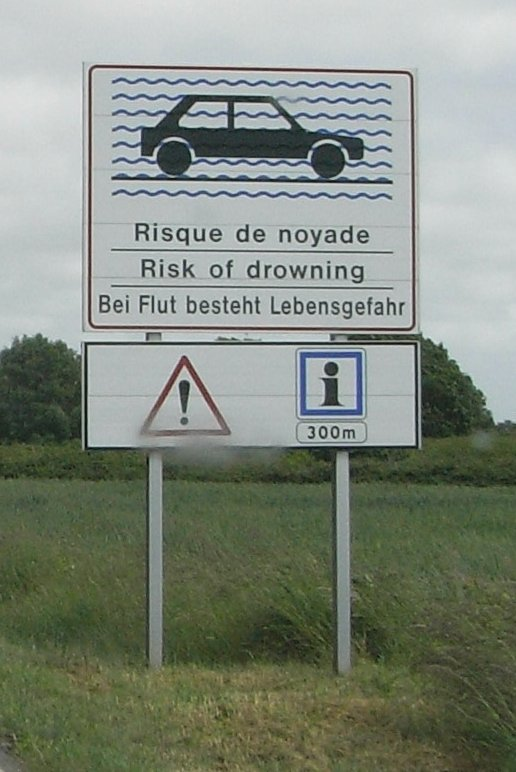
Risk of drowning

== See also ==
- The Broomway, a similar causeway to Foulness Island in Essex, England
