= Barbâtre =

- Commune
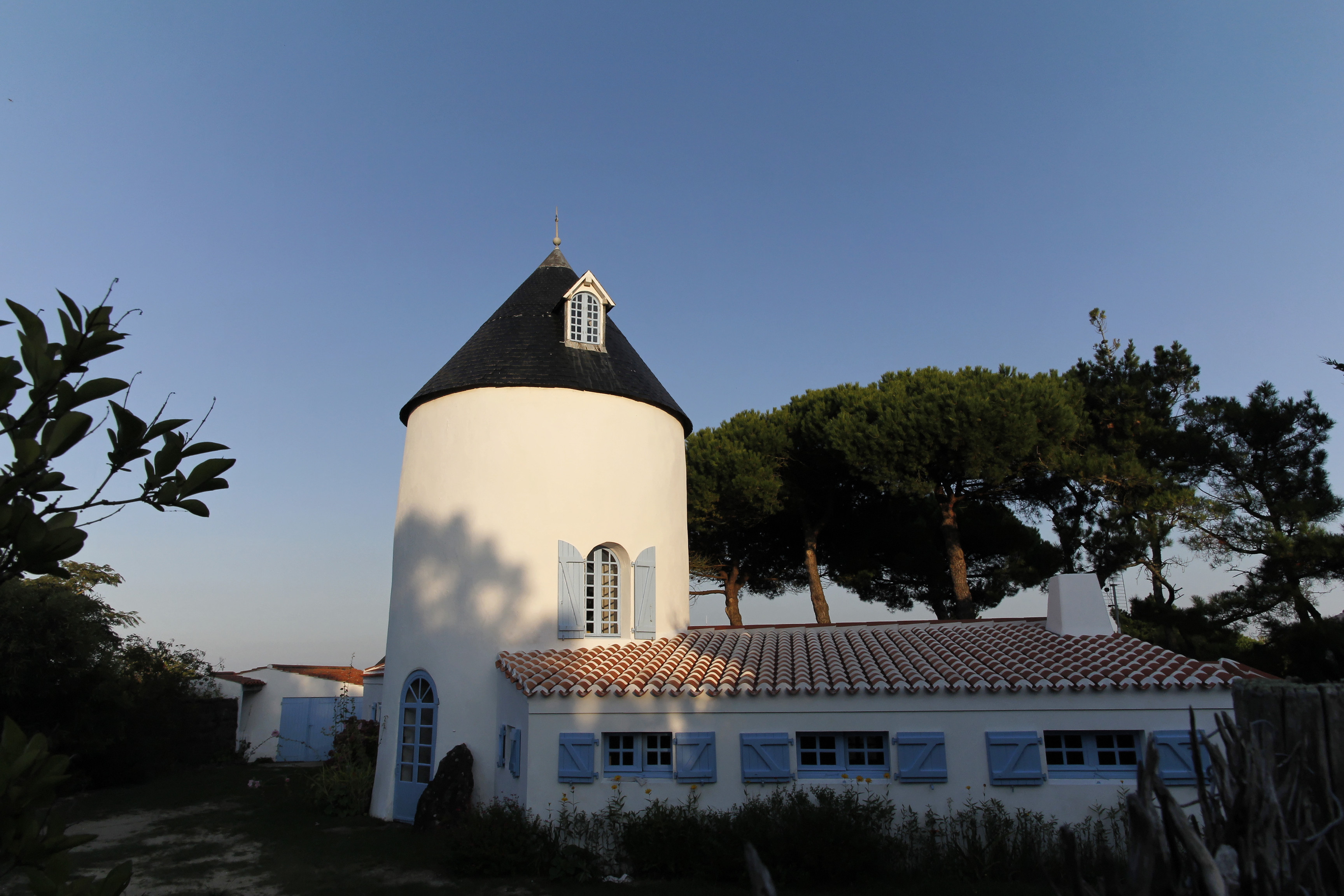
- The former Frandière mill, in Barbâtre

- Coat of arms
- Location of Barbâtre
- Location within France Location within Pays de la Loire
- Coordinates: 46°56′41″N 2°10′46″W
- Country: France
- Region: Pays de la Loire
- Department: Vendée
- Arrondissement: Les Sables-d'Olonne
- Canton: Saint-Jean-de-Monts
- Intercommunality: Île de Noirmoutier

Government
  - Mayor (2020–2026): Louis Gibier
- Area^{1}: 12.47 km^{2} (4.81 sq mi)
- Elevation: 5 m (16 ft)
- Highest elevation: 18 m (59 ft)
- Lowest elevation: 0 m (0 ft)
- Population (2023): 1,824
  - Density: 146.3/km^{2} (378.8/sq mi)
- Time zone: UTC+01:00 (CET)
  - Summer (DST): UTC+02:00 (CEST)
- INSEE/Postal code: 85011 /85630
- ^{1} French Land Register data, which excludes lakes, ponds, glaciers > 1 km^{2} (0.386 sq mi or 247 acres) and river estuaries.

Barbâtre (French pronunciation: [baʁbatʁ]) is a commune in the Vendée department in the Pays de la Loire region in western France.

== Geography ==
The altitude of the commune of Barbâtre lies between 0 and 19 meters. The area of the commune is 12.47 km^{2}.

== Arms ==
The arms of the commune feature a counterchanged sun without face on a blue and gold field divided horizontally ("per fess") in waves; the French blazon is coupé ondé d'azur et d'or, au soleil non figuré de l'un en l'autre.

== See also ==
- Communes of the Vendée department
