= La Barre-de-Monts =

- Commune
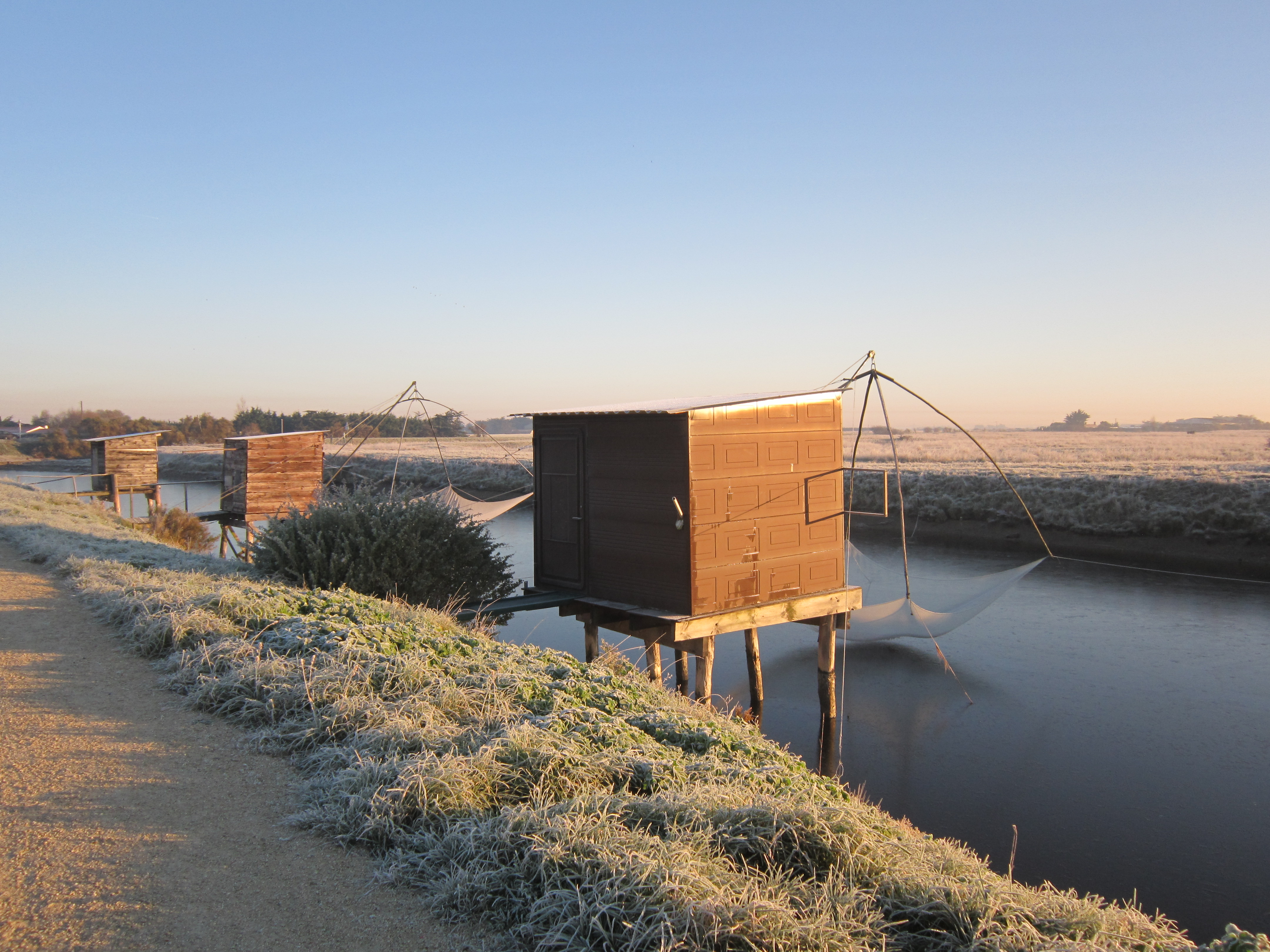
- Fishing for plaice, in Fromentine

- Coat of arms
- Location of La Barre-de-Monts
- Location within France Location within Pays de la Loire
- Coordinates: 46°53′05″N 2°07′01″W
- Country: France
- Region: Pays de la Loire
- Department: Vendée
- Arrondissement: Les Sables-d'Olonne
- Canton: Saint-Jean-de-Monts
- Intercommunality: Océan marais de Monts

Government
  - Mayor (2020–2026): Pascal Denis
- Area^{1}: 27.81 km^{2} (10.74 sq mi)
- Elevation: 5 m (16 ft)
- Highest elevation: 26 m (85 ft)
- Lowest elevation: 0 m (0 ft)
- Population (2023): 2,367
  - Density: 85.11/km^{2} (220.4/sq mi)
- Time zone: UTC+01:00 (CET)
  - Summer (DST): UTC+02:00 (CEST)
- INSEE/Postal code: 85012 /85550
- ^{1} French Land Register data, which excludes lakes, ponds, glaciers > 1 km^{2} (0.386 sq mi or 247 acres) and river estuaries.

La Barre-de-Monts (French pronunciation: [la baʁ də mɔ̃]) is a commune in the Vendée department in the Pays de la Loire region in western France.

== Population ==
Historical population
Year	Pop.	±% p.a.
1968	1,789	—
1975	1,674	−0.94%
1982	1,701	+0.23%
1990	1,727	+0.19%
1999	1,810	+0.52%
2007	2,100	+1.87%
2012	2,174	+0.70%
2017	2,199	+0.23%
2023	2,367	+1.23%
Source: INSEE

== See also ==
- Communes of the Vendée department
