= Fromentine =

Coordinates: 46.8910°N 2.1370°W

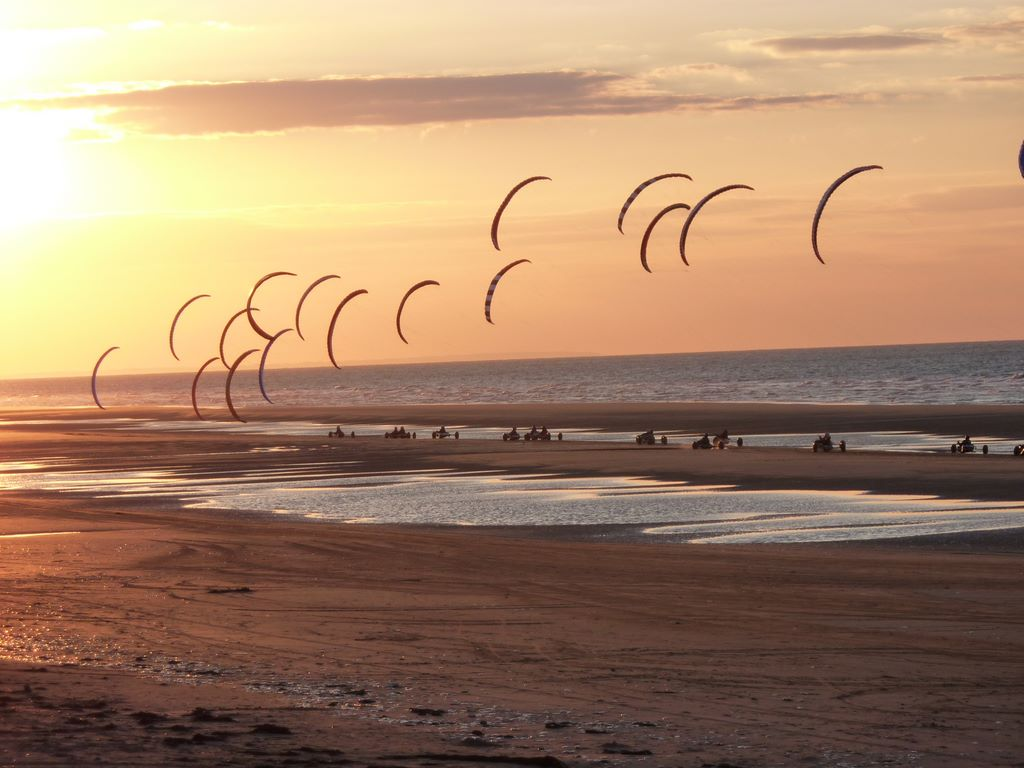
Fromentine savage coast

Fromentine (French pronunciation: [fʁɔmɑ̃tin]) is a district of La Barre-de-Monts, in the Vendée region of France. It is located opposite the island of Noirmoutier and is the main way to "l'Ile d'Yeu".

== History ==
The name Fromentine seems to be a transformation of froment (wheat in French), which was grown in these lands and was famous in the big west French cities (Like Nantes or Bordeaux)

For decades Fromentine has been the junction point for the French isles of Noirmoutier and Yeu. It wasn't colonised until the 19th century, when a few locals and the baron of Saint-Geniès, who was the owner of Fromentine lands, built their houses in the sand dunes of Fromentine.

Since then, more people have come, and Fromentine began to be the seaside station it is now at the dawn of the 20th century, when the train arrived for the first time (1896) in Fromentine, and linked it to the rest of the world, and brought the district developers who made the district what it is.

They built numerous villas and hotels and designed the station as a tourist attraction, or at least a passage point for the tourists going to Noirmoutier and Yeu.

During the Second World War, four Germans ships were sunk by the Canadian aviation only a hundred meters from Fromentine's main beach. They can still be seen at low tide.

Fromentine was linked to Noirmoutier by Noirmoutier's bridge in 1971, which was the first real way to Noirmoutier, considering the Gois isn't usable all the time, and that using boats wasn't the easiest way to cross the strait between the island and the land.

== Heritage ==
Most of Fromentine heritage is the result of its colonisation over the last two centuries.

=== The villas ===
On Fromentine backfil you can find a really uncommon line of seaside villas, from the very typical cottage of 1920, to the Arab-type villa Dar Koum" along with the Basque-like villas. They were for most of them built over the first decades of the 20th century, with the incoming of rich tourists from the cities. Some were homes, some secondary residences, and they were even seasonal rentals back at that time.

=== Notre-Dame-des-Flots ===
Fromentine chapel was built a few years after the war, between 1950 and 1952. It is named Our-Lady-of-the-Floods because the general architecture is designed as a ship hull.

=== Fromentine's lighthouse ===
This lighthouse was settled here in 1915. It is nearly unique, first because of the materials that have been used to craft it: metallic, which is rare, most of the lighthouse being built with concrete. It is also rare because of its size: only 33 feet when lighthouses usually get to more than 66 feet.

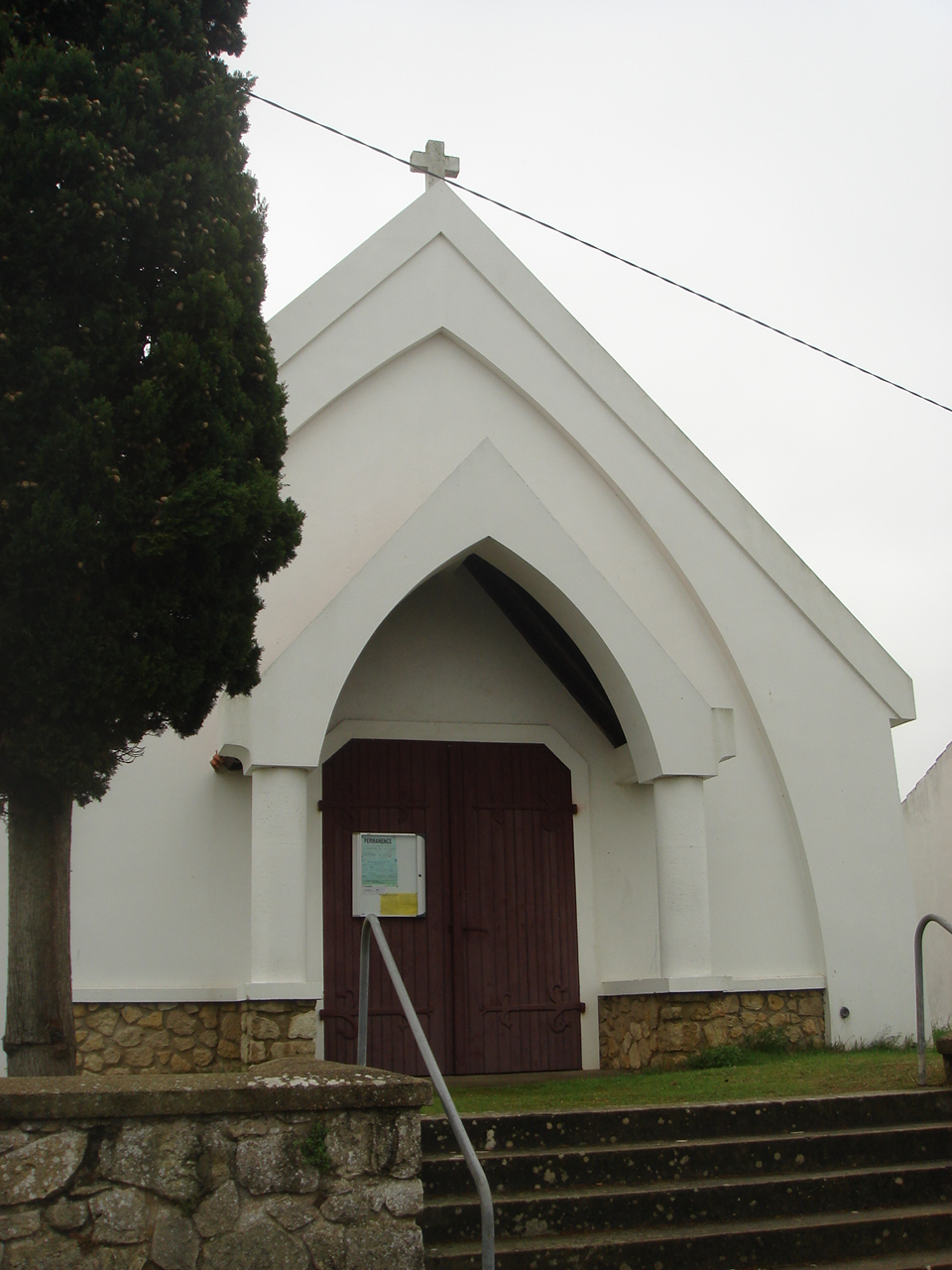
Fromentine "Notre-Dame-des-Flots"

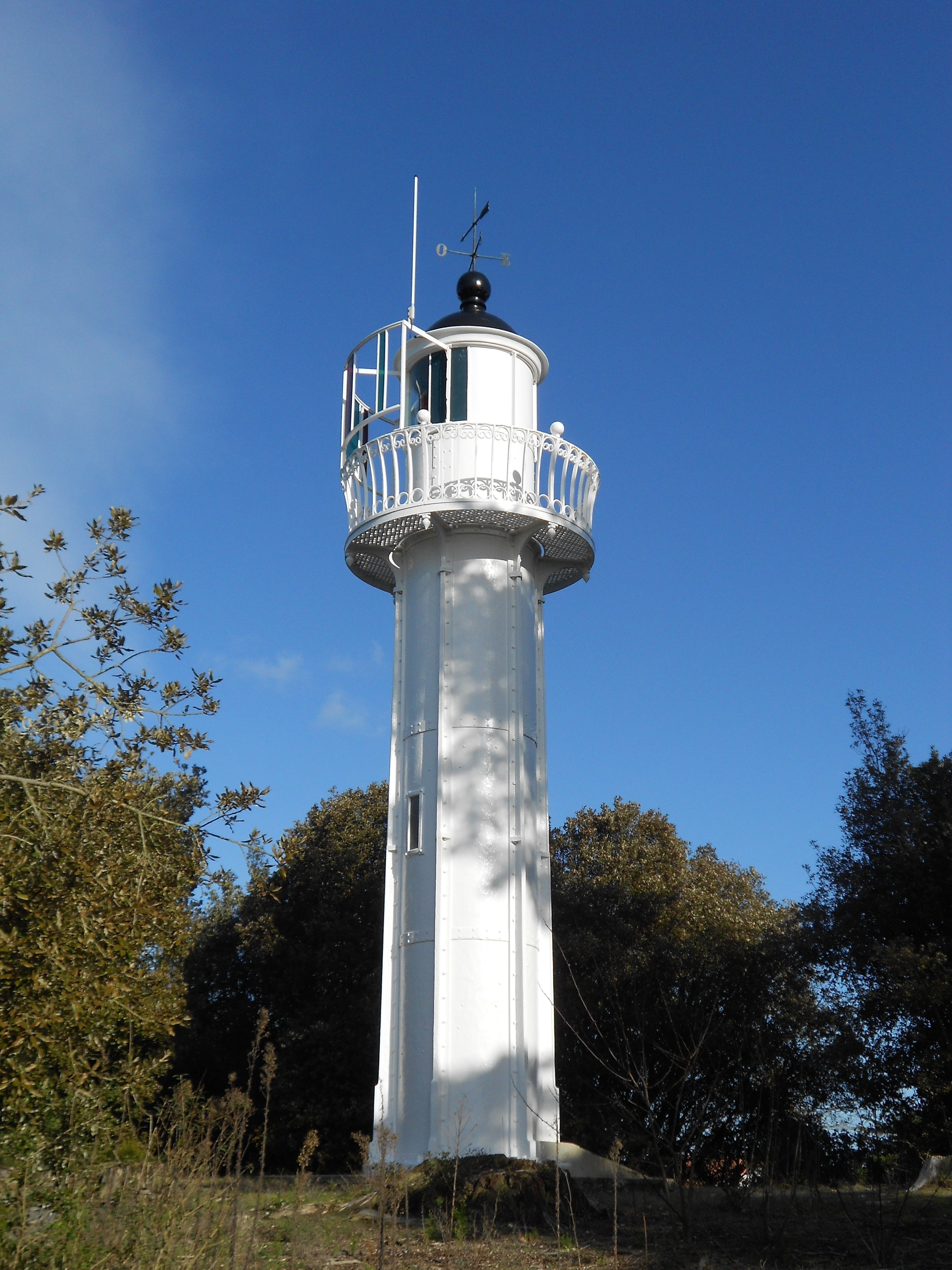
Fromentine's Lighthouse

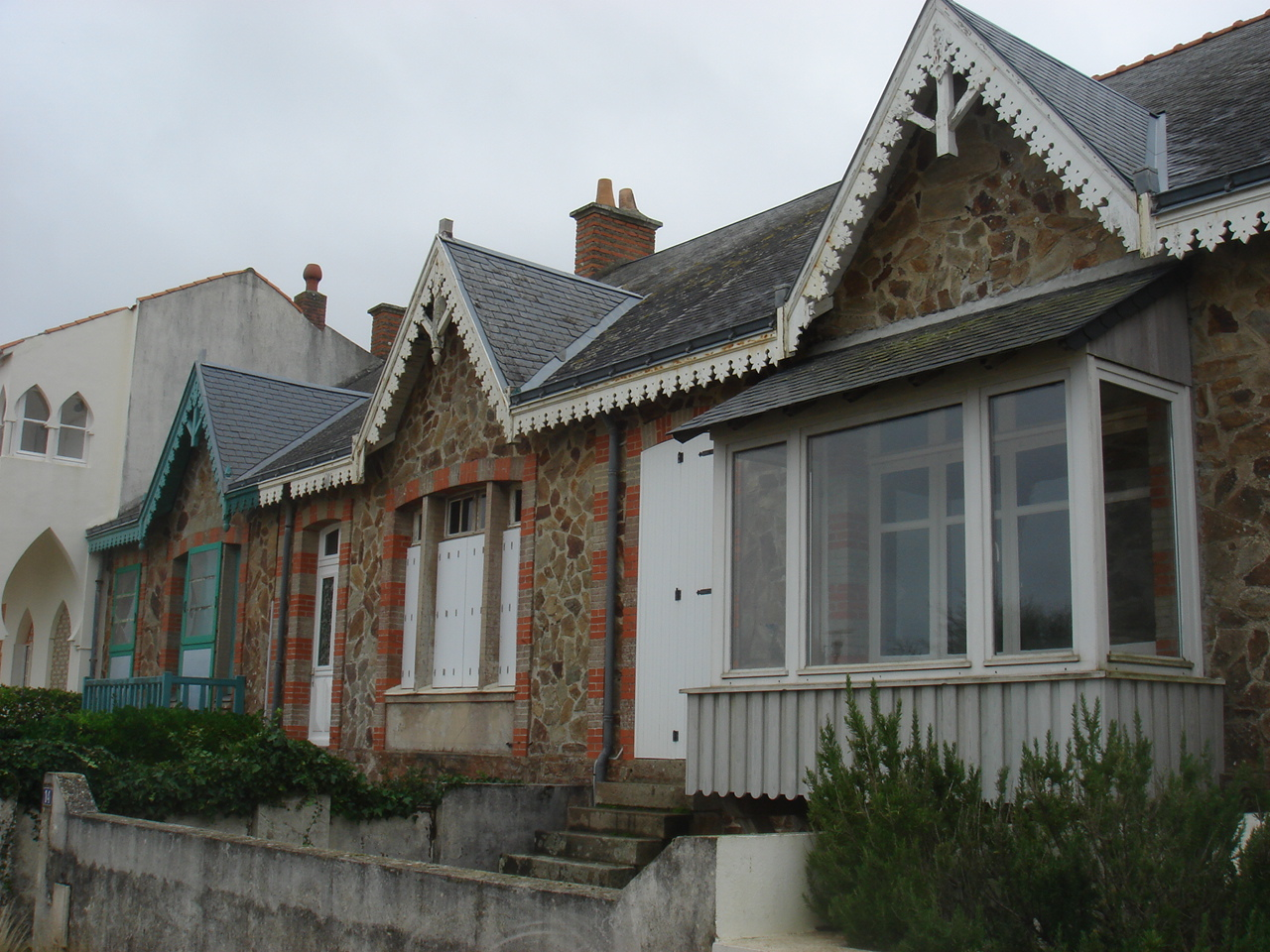
Line of villas facing the sea

== Sports d'Hiver à la mer ==
"Winter sports at the seaside" is a bunch of activities that has been set in Fromentine since 2009-2010. As the title states, it allow to enjoy the mountain and winter activities at the seaside. You can go dog sledding on the beach or snow-shoeing in the woods, or simply make a gourmet hike at night, enjoying food from both mountain and sea. A new activity of pine needles sledging is set in 2014.

It was first an initiative from La-Barre-de-Monts commune, and had as a goal to increase Fromentine tourism during winter, which generally left the town nearly empty. It is for now a success.

== Gallery ==
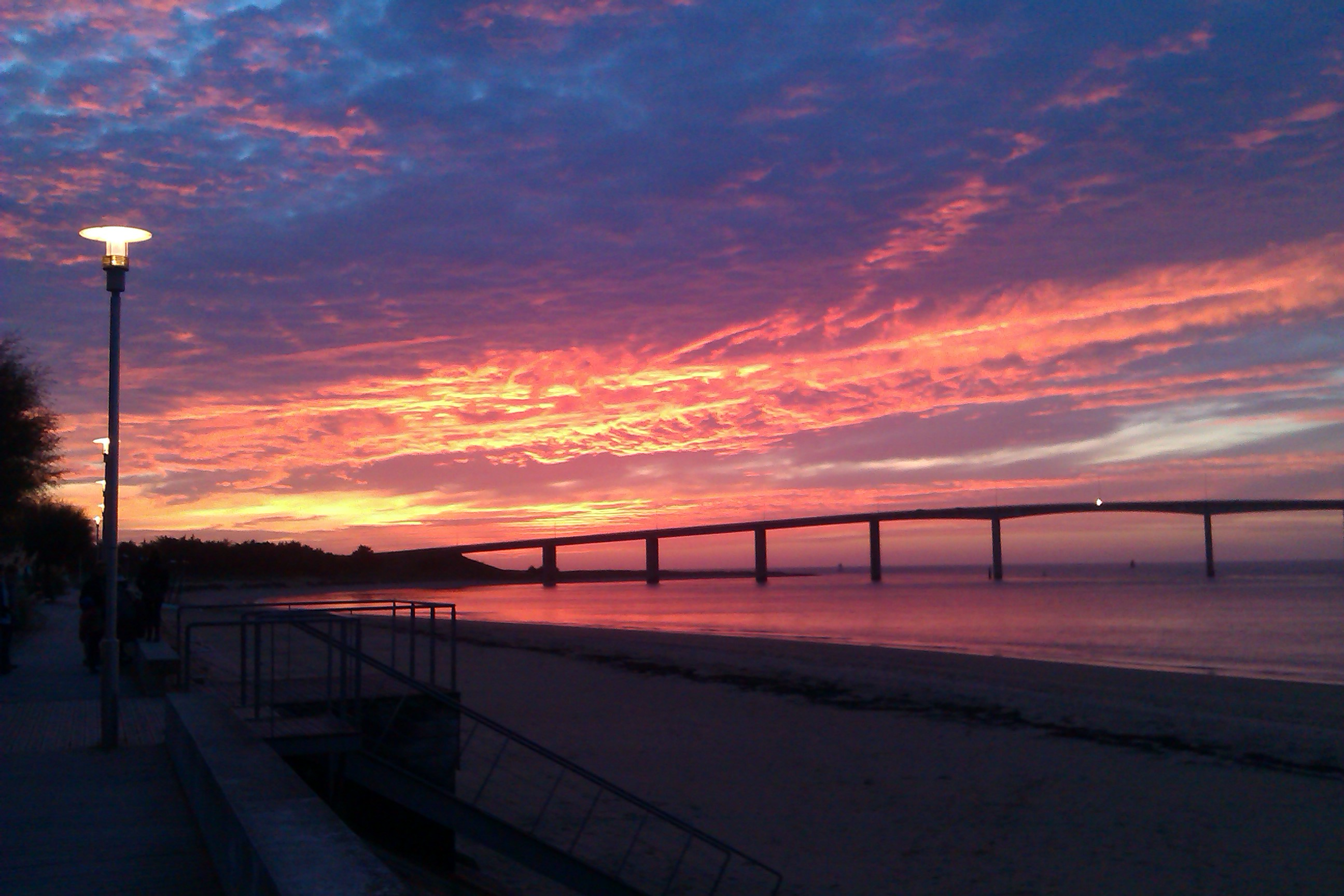
Sunset seen from Fromentine backfil

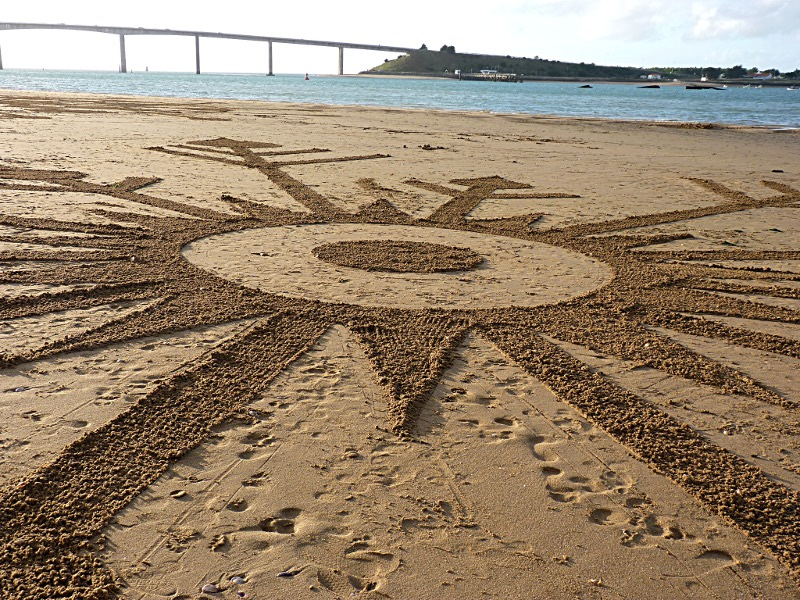
Sand art at Fromentine beach

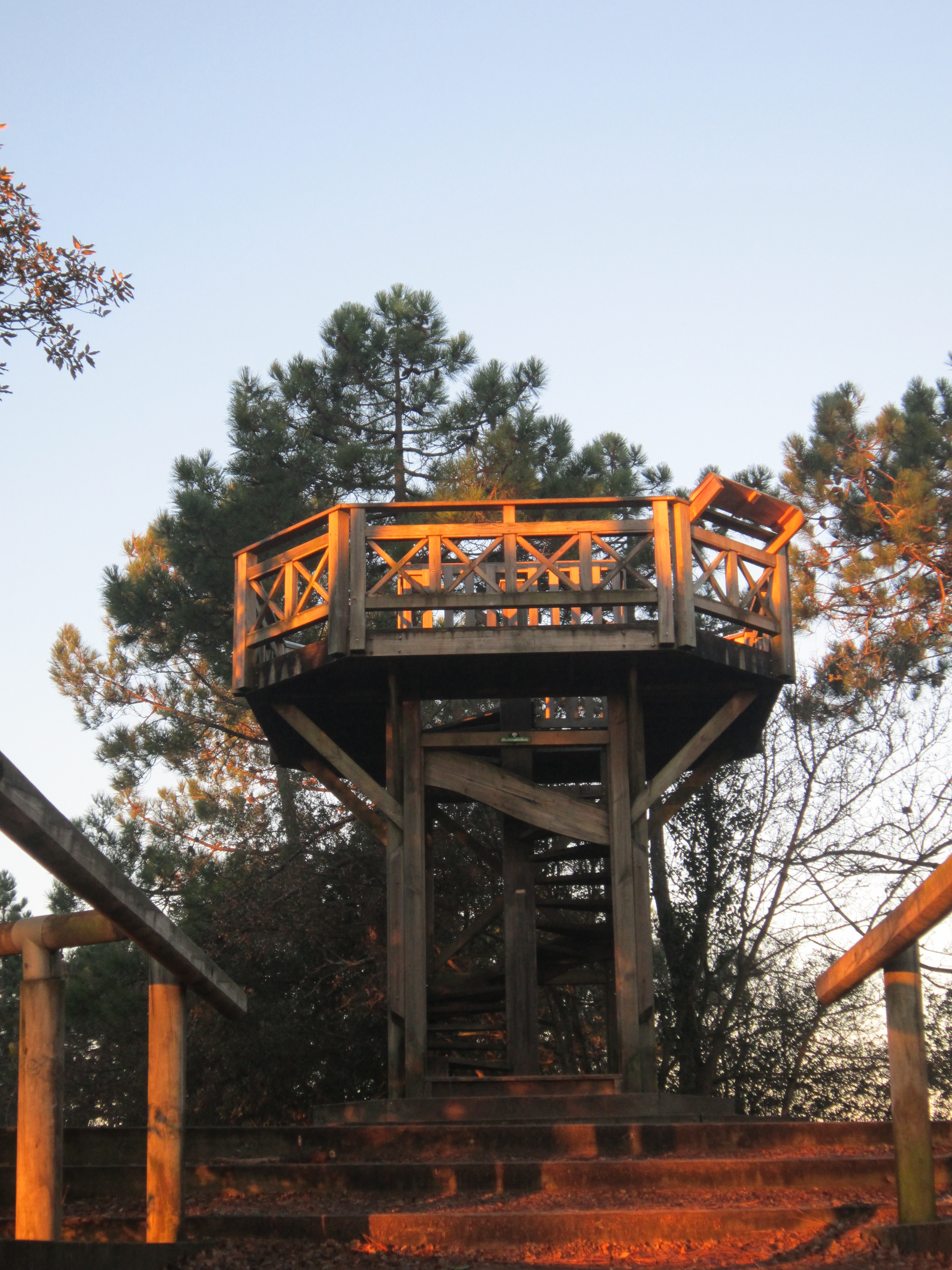
The "Pey de la Blet"

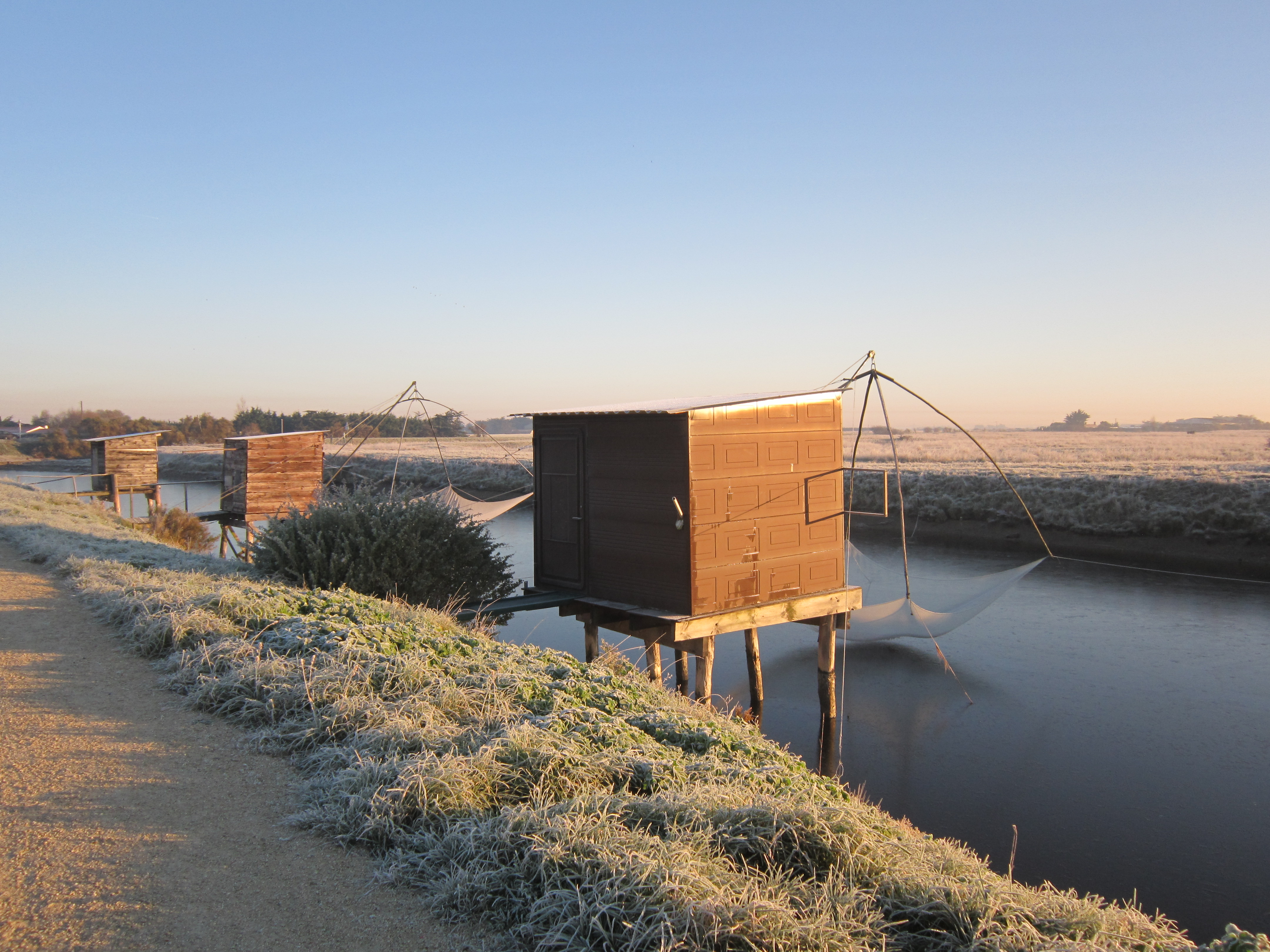
"Carrelet" fishing (method)

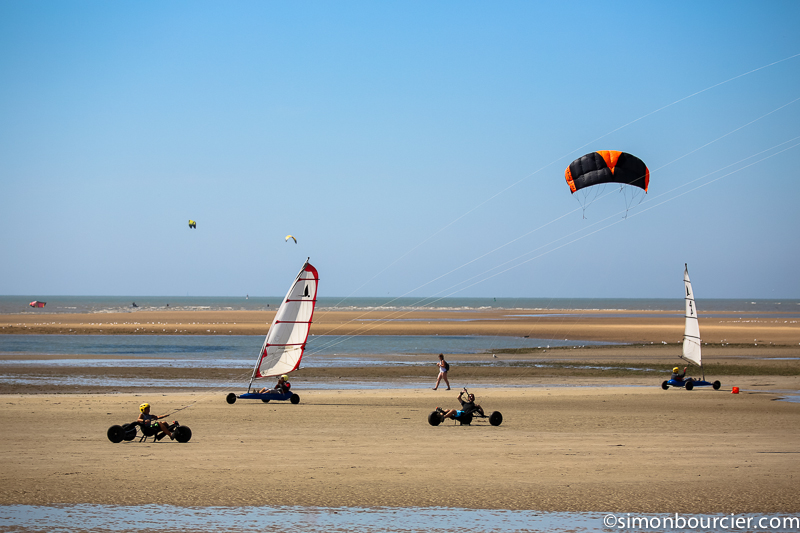
Kite on the beach
