= Saint-Jean-de-Monts =

- Commune
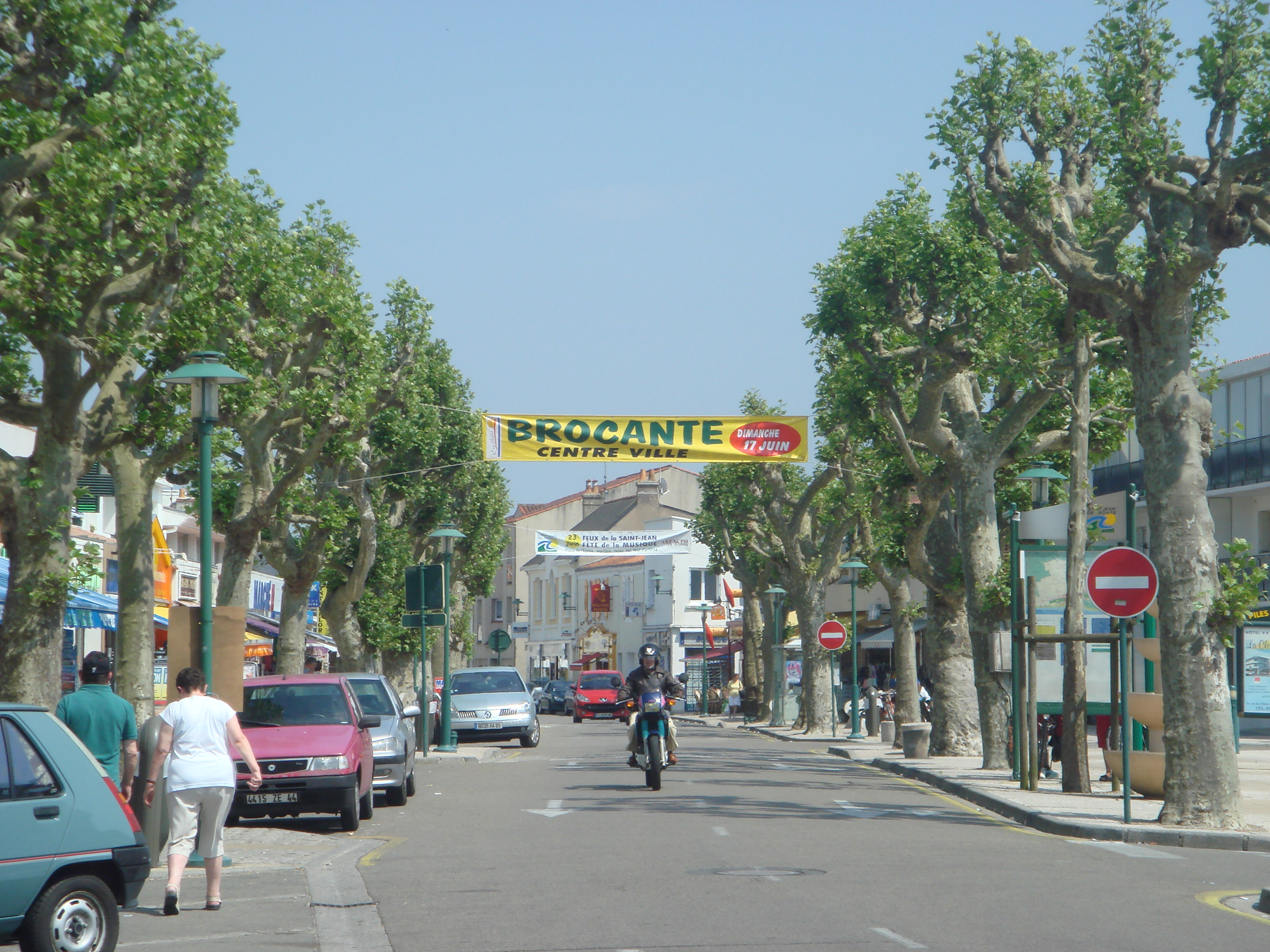
- Town centre of Saint-Jean-de-Monts

- Coat of arms
- Location of Saint-Jean-de-Monts
- Location within France Location within Pays de la Loire
- Coordinates: 46°47′37″N 2°03′31″W
- Country: France
- Region: Pays de la Loire
- Department: Vendée
- Arrondissement: Les Sables-d'Olonne
- Canton: Saint-Jean-de-Monts
- Intercommunality: Océan Marais de Monts

Government
  - Mayor (2020–2026): Véronique Launay
- Area^{1}: 61.72 km^{2} (23.83 sq mi)
- Population (2023): 8,868
  - Density: 143.7/km^{2} (372.1/sq mi)
- Time zone: UTC+01:00 (CET)
  - Summer (DST): UTC+02:00 (CEST)
- INSEE/Postal code: 85234 /
- ^{1} French Land Register data, which excludes lakes, ponds, glaciers > 1 km^{2} (0.386 sq mi or 247 acres) and river estuaries.

Saint-Jean-de-Monts (pronounced [sɛ̃ ʒɑ̃ də mɔ̃]) is a commune in the Vendée department in the Pays de la Loire region in western France.

== Geography ==
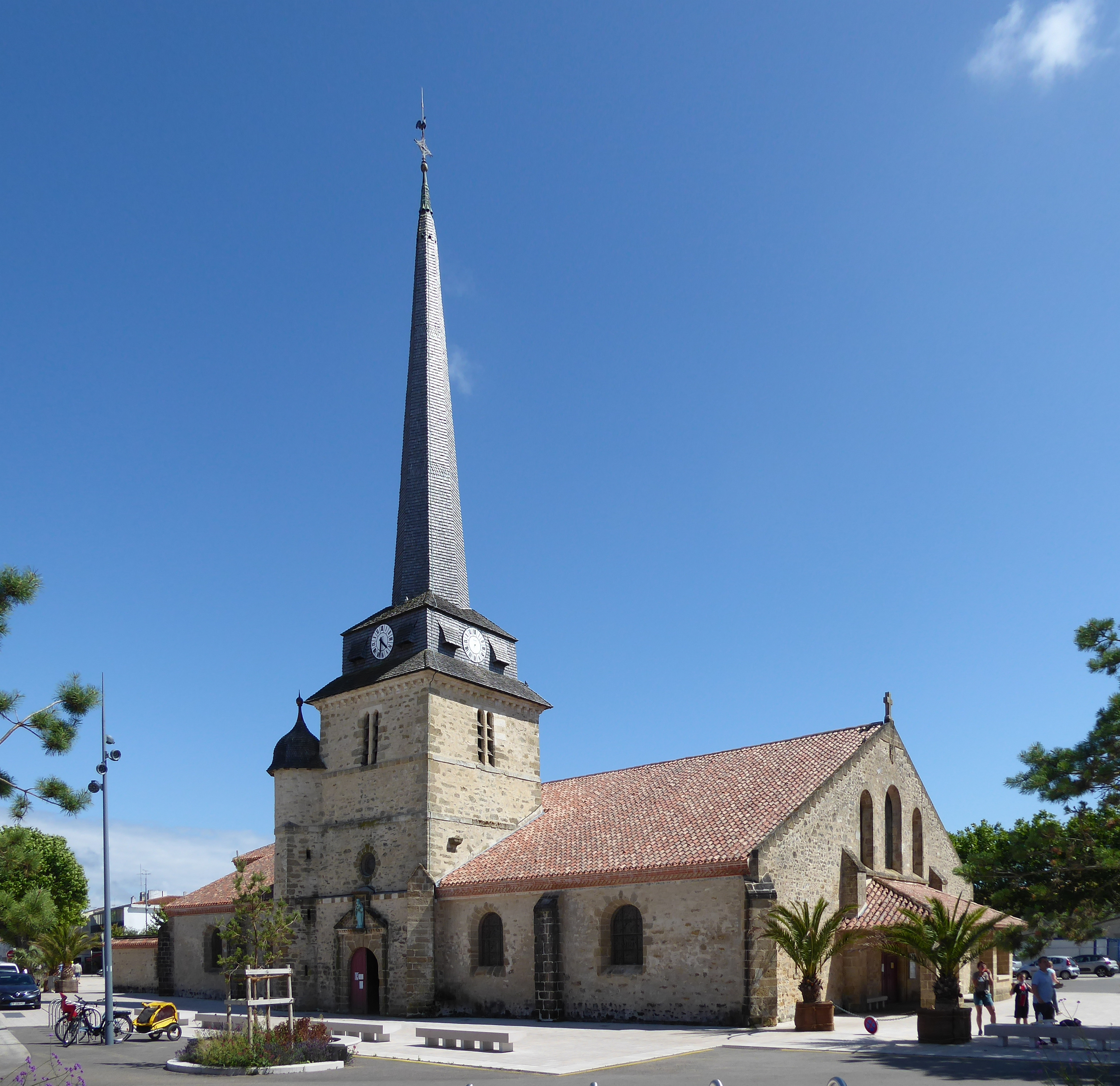
Church of Saint-Jean-Baptiste.

The town is situated in the west of the département, between Notre-Dame-de-Monts and Saint-Hilaire-de-Riez. It is split in two by a long plantation of pine trees, stretching from north to south along the coast. The centre-ville lies to the east of the cordon, while the seafront forms a center to the west.

Saint-Jean-de-Monts is known for its sandy beach, which is more than eight kilometres long. Due to its often low tides, it offers a great area for walkers, fishermen, and beach games.

The town is noteworthy for the recent restoration of its seafront, a town planning operation that took over five years to complete. The result now means a network of footpaths and cycle tracks are enhanced by plants, flowers and shrubs.

The predominantly flat terrain has allowed for the development of a vast 500 km^{2} network of cyclepaths, known as the Sentiers Cyclables de la Vendée. These paths stretch from the island of Noirmoutier in the north, south past Saint-Gilles-Croix-de-Vie.

=== Climate ===
Saint-Jean-de-Monts has an oceanic climate (Köppen climate classification Cfb) closely bordering on a warm-summer Mediterranean climate (Csb). The average annual temperature in Saint-Jean-de-Monts is 13.1 °C (55.6 °F). The average annual rainfall is 783.4 mm (30.84 in) with November as the wettest month. The temperatures are highest on average in July, at around 19.9 °C (67.8 °F), and lowest in January, at around 7.1 °C (44.8 °F). The highest temperature ever recorded in Saint-Jean-de-Monts was 39.5 °C (103.1 °F) on 27 June 2019; the coldest temperature ever recorded was −16.0 °C (3.2 °F) on 16 January 1985.

Climate data for Saint-Jean-de-Monts (1991−2020 normals, extremes 1968−2020)
Month	Jan	Feb	Mar	Apr	May	Jun	Jul	Aug	Sep	Oct	Nov	Dec	Year
Record high °C (°F)	17.5 (63.5)	22.0 (71.6)	24.0 (75.2)	30.0 (86.0)	32.0 (89.6)	39.5 (103.1)	37.7 (99.9)	38.3 (100.9)	33.0 (91.4)	28.5 (83.3)	22.0 (71.6)	17.0 (62.6)	39.5 (103.1)
Mean daily maximum °C (°F)	10.0 (50.0)	10.9 (51.6)	13.8 (56.8)	16.5 (61.7)	19.8 (67.6)	23.1 (73.6)	24.9 (76.8)	24.9 (76.8)	22.5 (72.5)	18.1 (64.6)	13.7 (56.7)	10.8 (51.4)	17.4 (63.3)
Daily mean °C (°F)	7.1 (44.8)	7.2 (45.0)	9.6 (49.3)	11.7 (53.1)	15.1 (59.2)	18.1 (64.6)	19.9 (67.8)	19.8 (67.6)	17.2 (63.0)	14.1 (57.4)	10.2 (50.4)	7.6 (45.7)	13.1 (55.6)
Mean daily minimum °C (°F)	4.1 (39.4)	3.5 (38.3)	5.3 (41.5)	7.0 (44.6)	10.4 (50.7)	13.2 (55.8)	14.9 (58.8)	14.7 (58.5)	11.9 (53.4)	10.1 (50.2)	6.7 (44.1)	4.5 (40.1)	8.9 (48.0)
Record low °C (°F)	−16.0 (3.2)	−12.5 (9.5)	−10.7 (12.7)	−3.5 (25.7)	0.0 (32.0)	4.5 (40.1)	7.0 (44.6)	5.0 (41.0)	1.8 (35.2)	−4.5 (23.9)	−7.0 (19.4)	−9.5 (14.9)	−16.0 (3.2)
Average precipitation mm (inches)	84.5 (3.33)	62.8 (2.47)	54.5 (2.15)	58.0 (2.28)	52.7 (2.07)	38.5 (1.52)	37.3 (1.47)	44.9 (1.77)	62.8 (2.47)	94.1 (3.70)	97.9 (3.85)	95.4 (3.76)	783.4 (30.84)
Average precipitation days (≥ 1.0 mm)	13.9	11.4	10.0	9.9	8.3	7.3	7.1	7.0	8.1	12.7	14.1	14.9	124.7
Source: Météo-France

== History ==
Since 1867, bathers have been coming to the beach at Saint-Jean-de-Monts in large numbers, and since 1892 it has been the inspiration for many artists. The original church still lies in the center of the old village.

== Demographics ==
Historical population
Year	Pop.	±% p.a.
1968	5,146	—
1975	5,540	+1.06%
1982	5,435	−0.27%
1990	5,959	+1.16%
1999	6,886	+1.62%
2007	7,699	+1.40%
2012	8,221	+1.32%
2017	8,634	+0.99%
2023	8,868	+0.45%
Source: INSEE

== Places of interest ==
- The pier on the beach (built in 1964) acts as a pontoon over the sea, and is a popular location for fishermen and walkers, although, unfortunately, during the storm of February 2010, the pier was significantly damaged. It has been completely deconstructed during the winter 2011. The new version of the pier was finished in 2013.
- A sculpture of two birds is in memory of Auguste Lepère and Charles Milcendeau.
- A sculpture by Henry MURAIL (1932–2012), La Baigneuse, at the end of "avenue de la mer", in front of the sea (1999).
- The national forest of 280 hectares, in the heart of the Breton / Vendée marshes, was planted under Napoléon III.

== Gallery ==
Seafront at Saint-Jean-de-Monts

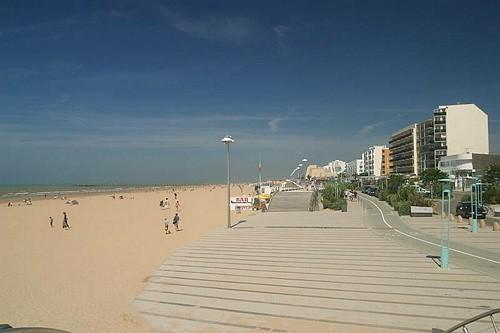
Seafront

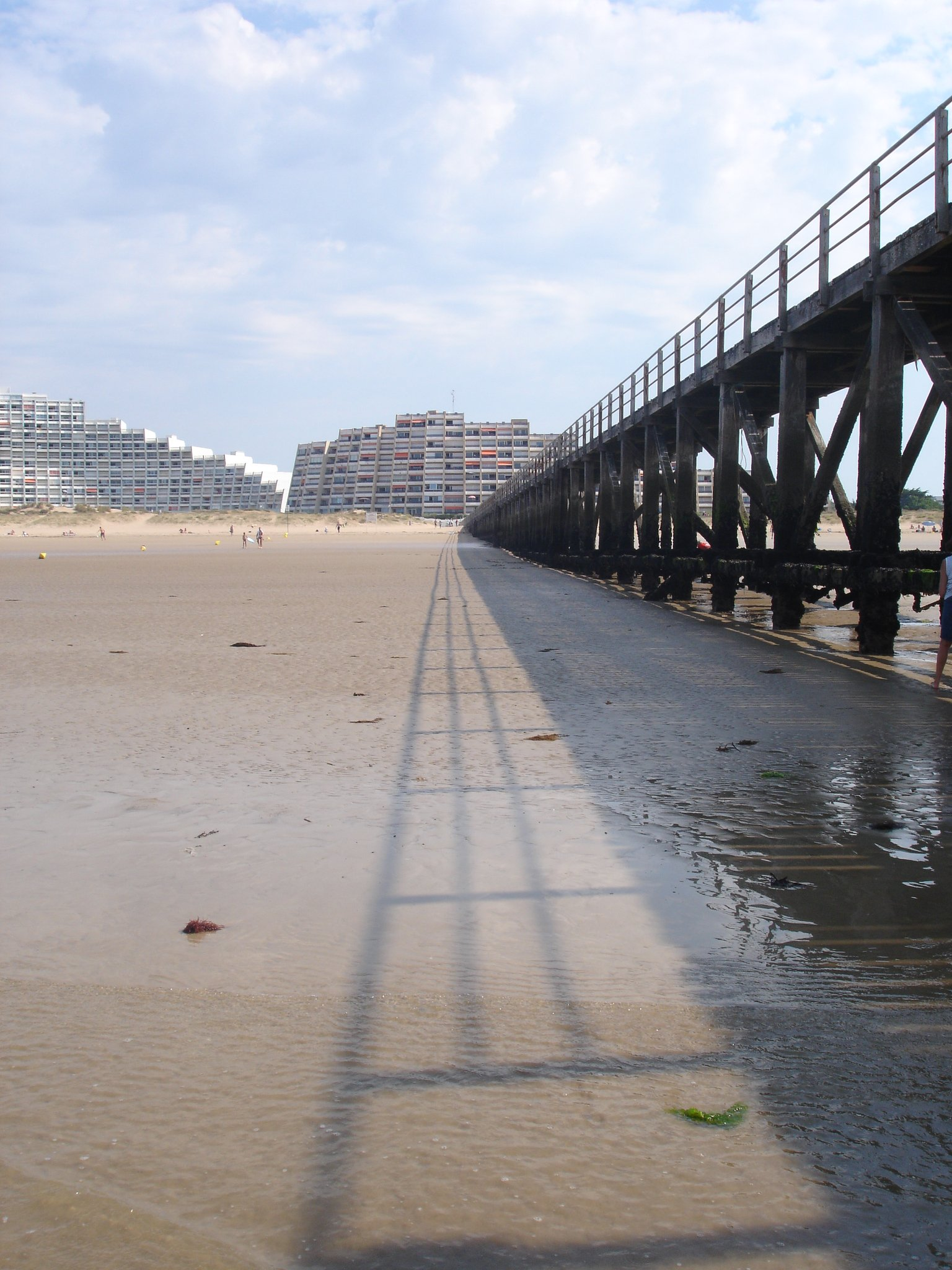
Pier

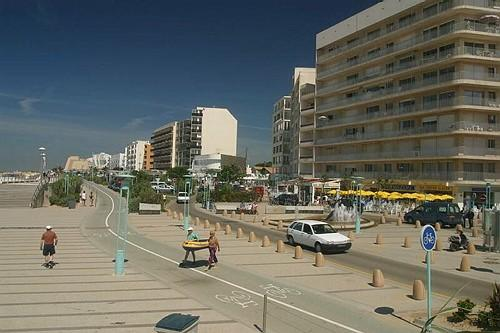
Apartments

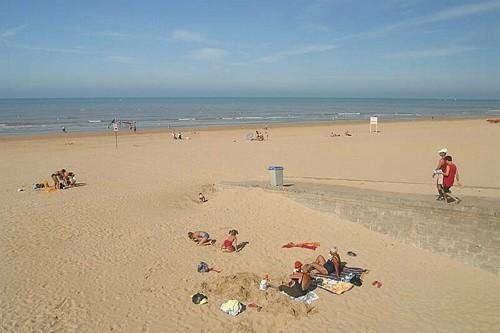
Beach

== See also ==
- Communes of the Vendée department
