= Noirmoutier-en-l'Île =

- Commune
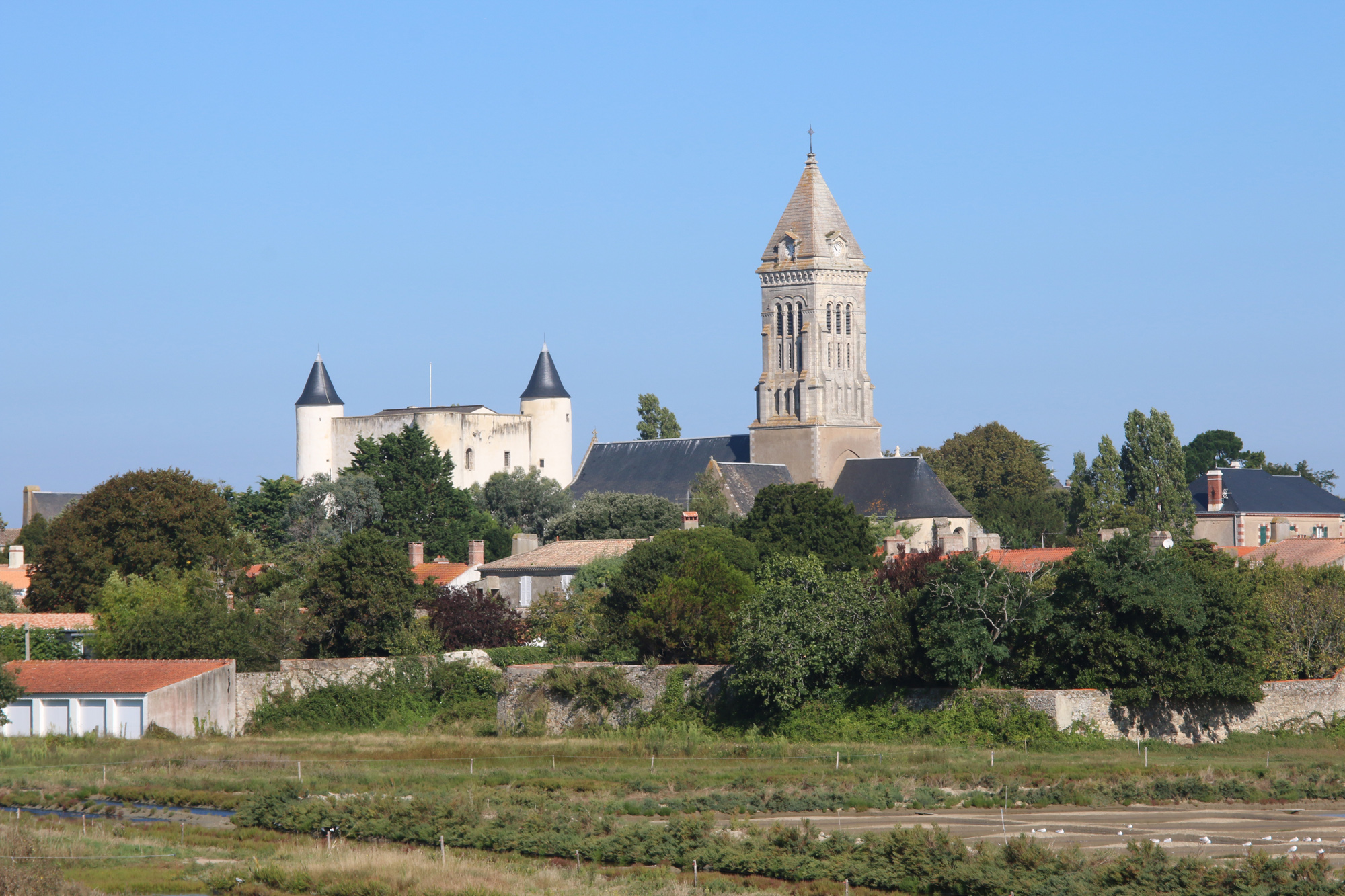
- The church and the château in Noirmoutier-en-Île

- Coat of arms
- Location of Noirmoutier-en-l'Île
- Location within France Location within Pays de la Loire
- Coordinates: 47°00′16″N 2°15′12″W
- Country: France
- Region: Pays de la Loire
- Department: Vendée
- Arrondissement: Les Sables-d'Olonne
- Canton: Saint-Jean-de-Monts

Government
  - Mayor (2020–2026): Yan Balat
- Area^{1}: 19.59 km^{2} (7.56 sq mi)
- Elevation: 7 m (23 ft)
- Highest elevation: 20 m (66 ft)
- Lowest elevation: 0 m (0 ft)
- Population (2023): 4,505
  - Density: 230.0/km^{2} (595.6/sq mi)
- Time zone: UTC+01:00 (CET)
  - Summer (DST): UTC+02:00 (CEST)
- INSEE/Postal code: 85163 /85330
- ^{1} French Land Register data, which excludes lakes, ponds, glaciers > 1 km^{2} (0.386 sq mi or 247 acres) and river estuaries.

Noirmoutier-en-l'Île (French pronunciation: [nwaʁmutje ɑ̃ lil]), commonly referred to as Noirmoutier, is a commune located in the northern part of the island of Noirmoutier, just off the coast of the Vendée department in the Pays de la Loire region in western France.

== History ==
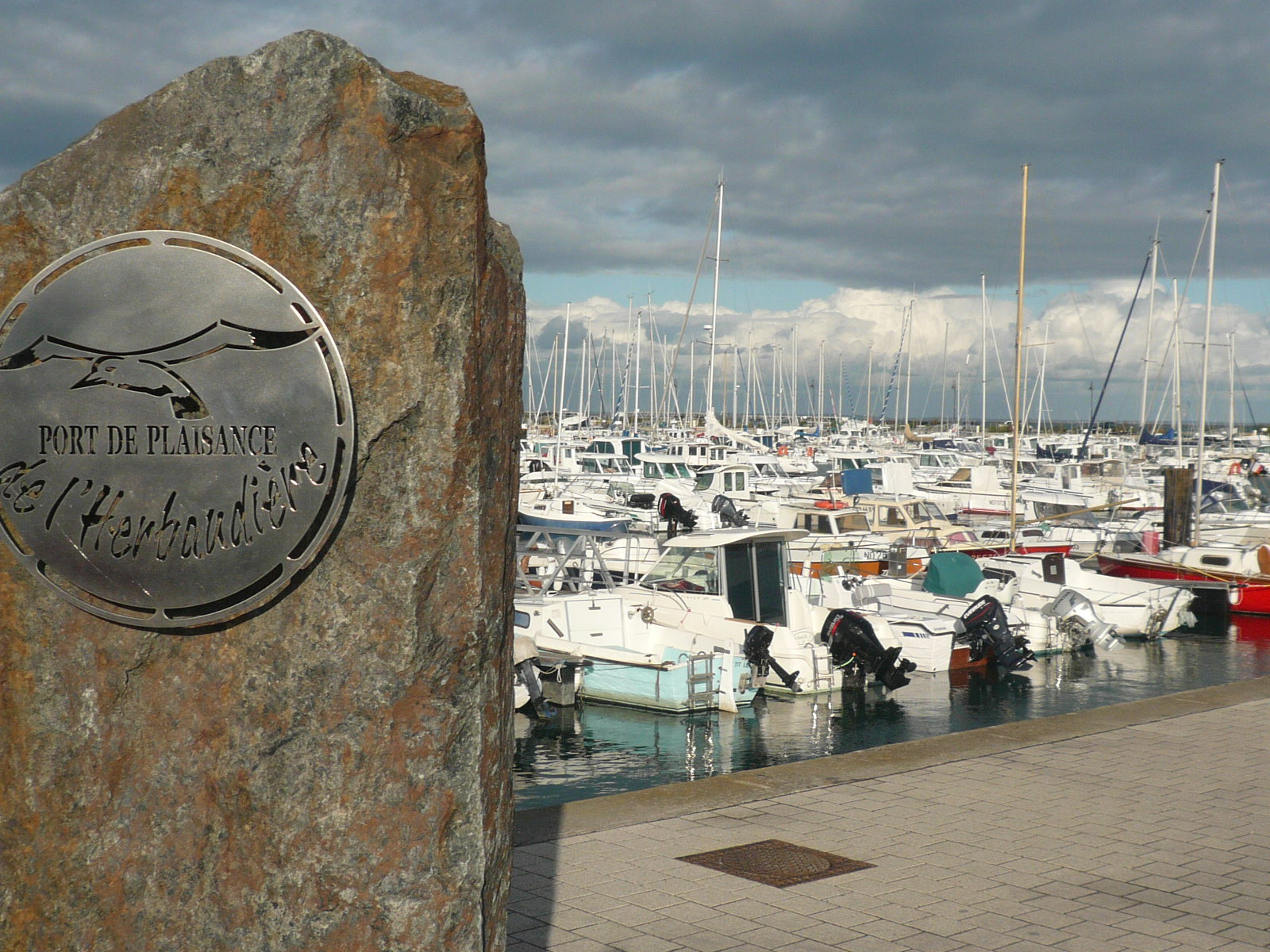
L'Herbaudière marina

The history of the town began with the arrival of the monk Saint Philibert in 674 who founded a monastery. The Château de Noirmoutier dates from the 11th and 12th century. In summer the area is a tourist resort. The name is recorded in Latin as Nerium Monasterium, wrongly written by some as Nigrum Monasterium ("Black Monastery").

In the second part of the 17th century, the island was a center of tobacco smuggling, just like Paimboeuf. Indeed, Louis XIV created in November 1674 a tobacco farm which bought tobacco from the Antilles at low prices to resell to high prices, exposing themselves to competition from tobacco from the Virginia. Imported stocks are then sold on the continent using small boats called chattes.

Until 1858, the territory of the commune extended over the whole of the island, then began to be fragmented with the creation of the commune of Barbâtre, followed, some sixty years later, in 1919, by those of La Guérinière and from L'Épine.

== Geography ==
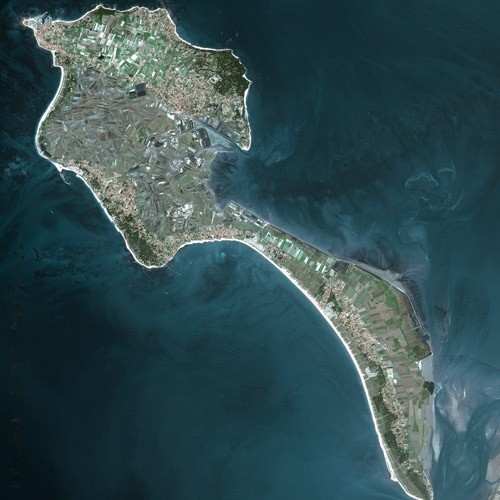
The commune is located in the northern part of Noirmoutier Island

Noirmoutier-en-l'Île is situated in the north of the island of Noirmoutier, in the Atlantic Ocean. The commune covers the northern point of the island, and contains three villages: Noirmoutier, L'Herbaudiere and Le Vieil. L'Herbaudiere is a noteworthy port and is managed by the Chamber of Commerce and Industry of the Vendée. The inconvenient location in relation to the town and economic success of the village encouraged its inhabitants to seek the establishment of a commune independent from Noirmoutier-en-l'Île. Le Vieil is also located on the north coast within the commune. It is a popular destination for vacationers over the summer. An inventor Brutus de Villeroi tested the first French submarine in the village on 12 August 1832. An old street bears his name.

=== Climate ===
Noirmoutier-en-l'Île has an oceanic climate (Köppen climate classification Cfb) closely bordering on a warm-summer Mediterranean climate (Csb). The average annual temperature in Noirmoutier-en-l'Île is 13.4 °C (56.1 °F). The average annual rainfall is 704.1 mm (27.72 in) with November as the wettest month. The temperatures are highest on average in August, at around 19.8 °C (67.6 °F), and lowest in January, at around 7.4 °C (45.3 °F). The highest temperature ever recorded in Noirmoutier-en-l'Île was 38.7 °C (101.7 °F) on 18 July 2022; the coldest temperature ever recorded was −10.0 °C (14.0 °F) on 16 January 1985.

Climate data for Noirmoutier-en-l'Île (1991−2020 normals, extremes 1959−present)
Month	Jan	Feb	Mar	Apr	May	Jun	Jul	Aug	Sep	Oct	Nov	Dec	Year
Record high °C (°F)	15.5 (59.9)	19.9 (67.8)	22.9 (73.2)	27.5 (81.5)	31.3 (88.3)	36.0 (96.8)	38.7 (101.7)	37.0 (98.6)	33.0 (91.4)	27.1 (80.8)	20.9 (69.6)	16.1 (61.0)	38.7 (101.7)
Mean daily maximum °C (°F)	9.6 (49.3)	10.2 (50.4)	12.8 (55.0)	15.3 (59.5)	18.6 (65.5)	21.6 (70.9)	23.3 (73.9)	23.5 (74.3)	21.4 (70.5)	17.4 (63.3)	13.2 (55.8)	10.4 (50.7)	16.4 (61.5)
Daily mean °C (°F)	7.4 (45.3)	7.6 (45.7)	9.8 (49.6)	11.9 (53.4)	15.1 (59.2)	17.9 (64.2)	19.6 (67.3)	19.8 (67.6)	17.8 (64.0)	14.6 (58.3)	10.8 (51.4)	8.1 (46.6)	13.4 (56.1)
Mean daily minimum °C (°F)	5.2 (41.4)	5.0 (41.0)	6.8 (44.2)	8.5 (47.3)	11.6 (52.9)	14.3 (57.7)	15.9 (60.6)	16.2 (61.2)	14.2 (57.6)	11.9 (53.4)	8.4 (47.1)	5.9 (42.6)	10.3 (50.5)
Record low °C (°F)	−10.0 (14.0)	−7.7 (18.1)	−6.0 (21.2)	−0.3 (31.5)	0.5 (32.9)	3.6 (38.5)	10.4 (50.7)	9.4 (48.9)	6.4 (43.5)	1.7 (35.1)	−4.0 (24.8)	−8.0 (17.6)	−10.0 (14.0)
Average precipitation mm (inches)	75.0 (2.95)	59.1 (2.33)	51.4 (2.02)	51.7 (2.04)	48.7 (1.92)	37.0 (1.46)	36.7 (1.44)	38.9 (1.53)	54.0 (2.13)	81.1 (3.19)	86.6 (3.41)	83.9 (3.30)	704.1 (27.72)
Average precipitation days (≥ 1.0 mm)	12.4	9.9	9.0	9.3	8.0	6.8	6.8	6.4	7.7	11.9	12.9	13.2	114.3
Source: Météo-France

== Population ==
Historical population
Year	Pop.	±% p.a.
1968	4,020	—
1975	4,070	+0.18%
1982	4,518	+1.50%
1990	4,846	+0.88%
1999	5,001	+0.35%
2007	4,842	−0.40%
2012	4,547	−1.25%
2017	4,668	+0.53%
2023	4,505	−0.59%
Source: INSEE

== Economy ==
=== Cuisine ===
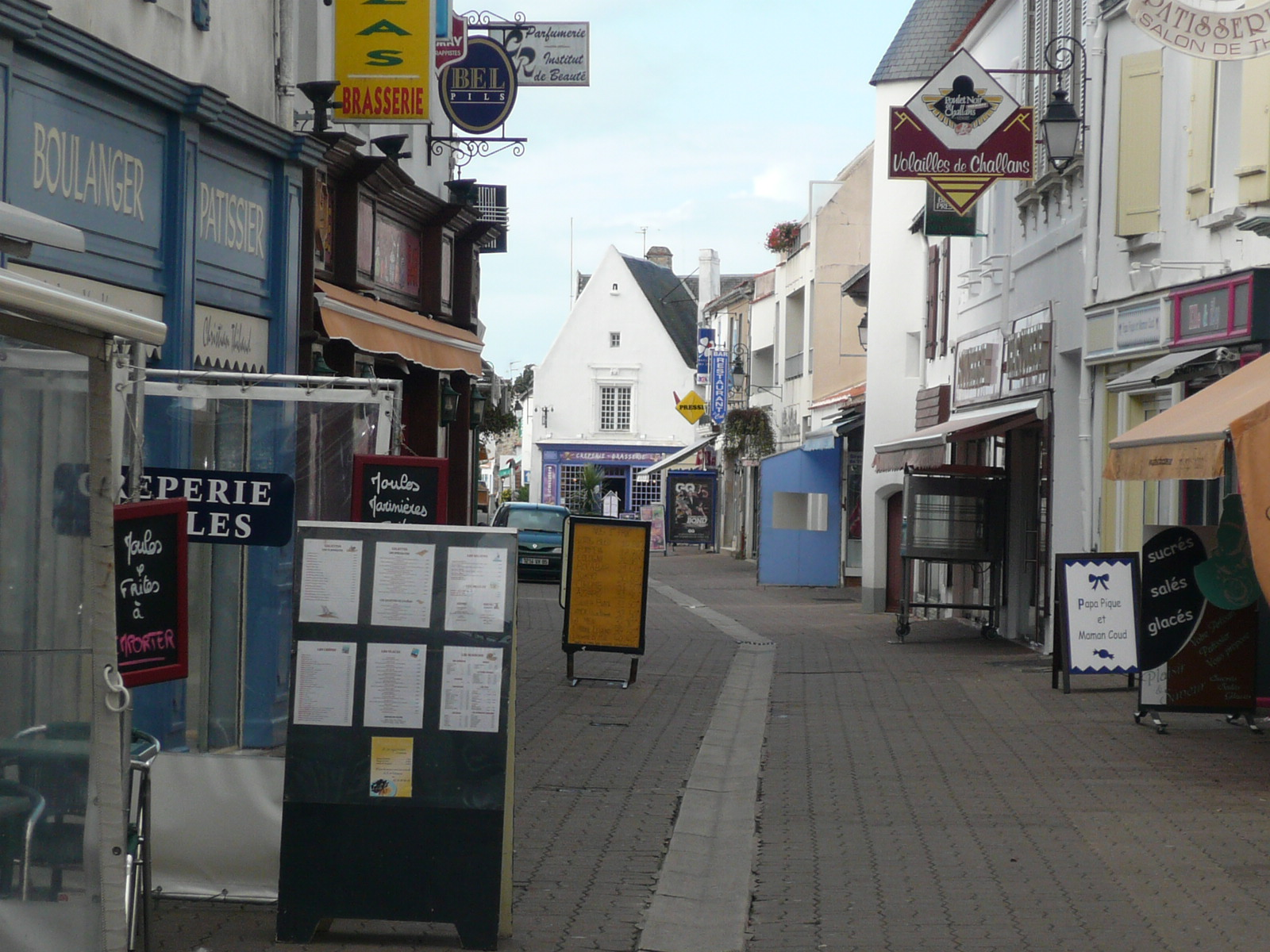
The commercial center of Noirmoutier

Noirmoutier is home to the most expensive potatoes in the world. Known as "La Bonnotte", only around 100 tons of this top quality potato are cultivated annually and it is harvested only on the island Noirmoutier. The cost of one kilogram can reach €500 (US $322 per pound), but the potatoes are normally sold for around €70 per kilo (US $45 per pound). The cost is attributed to the fact that this type of potato is almost extinct because it must be harvested by hand. The potato fields also require fertilization by seaweed in a climate shaped by the nearby sea. The presence of algae and seaweed in the soil is responsible for the potato's earthy and salty flavor. Because the variety is delicate and its tuber remains attached to its stem, the potato must be picked and not torn. The potatoes are generally served in top class restaurants in France and the Netherlands in mid-May.

The commune was also part of the 2005, 2011 and 2018 Tour de France, including playing host to the Grand Depart in 2018.

== Landmarks ==
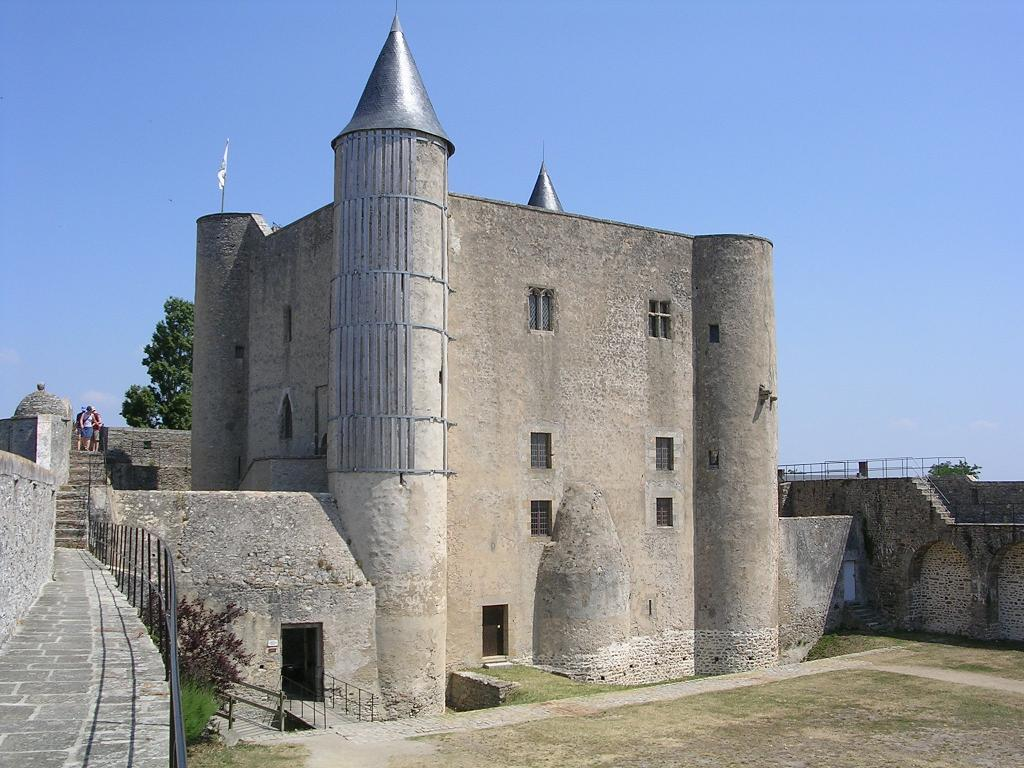
Château de Noirmoutier

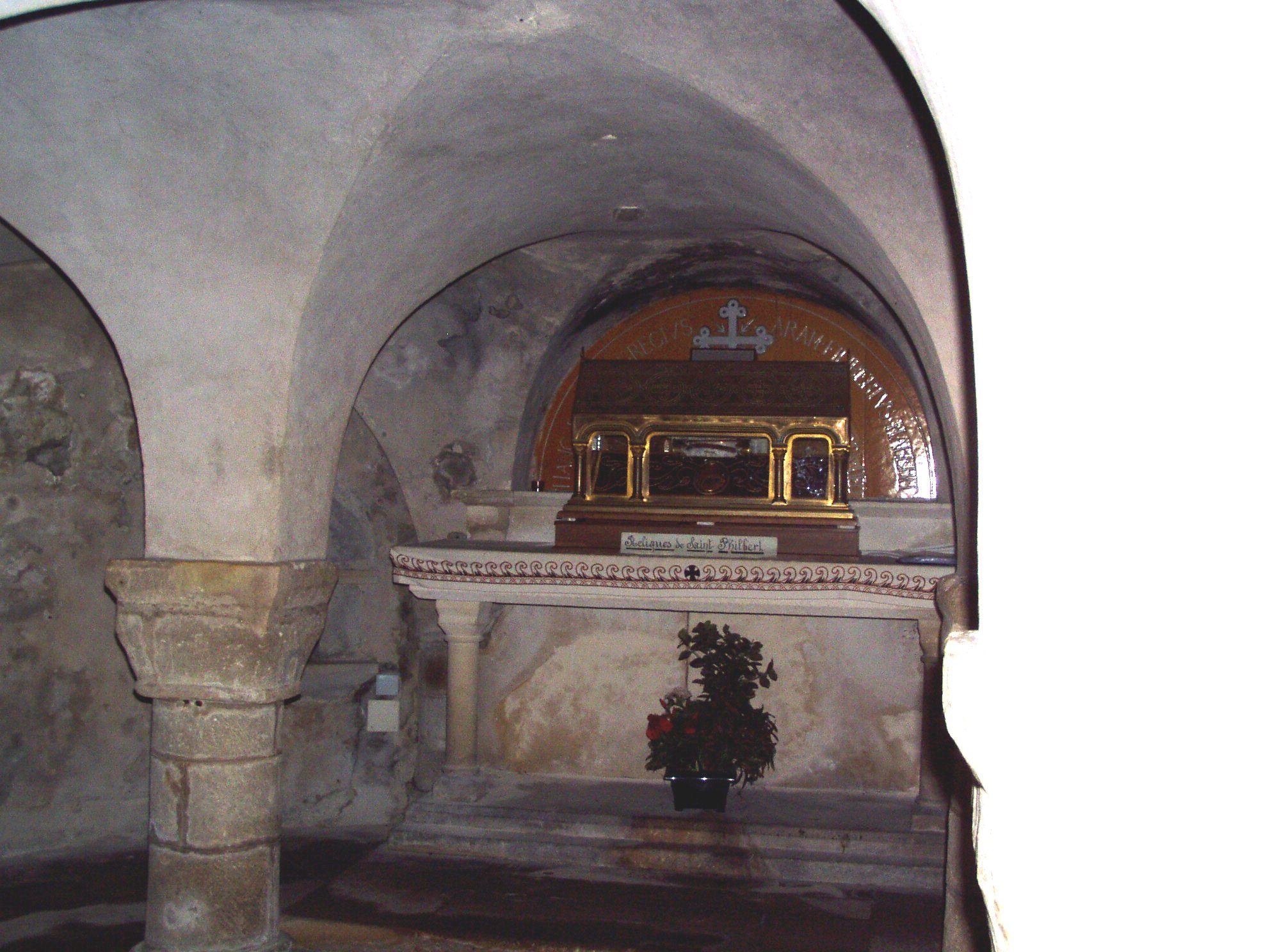
The crypt of St. Philbert

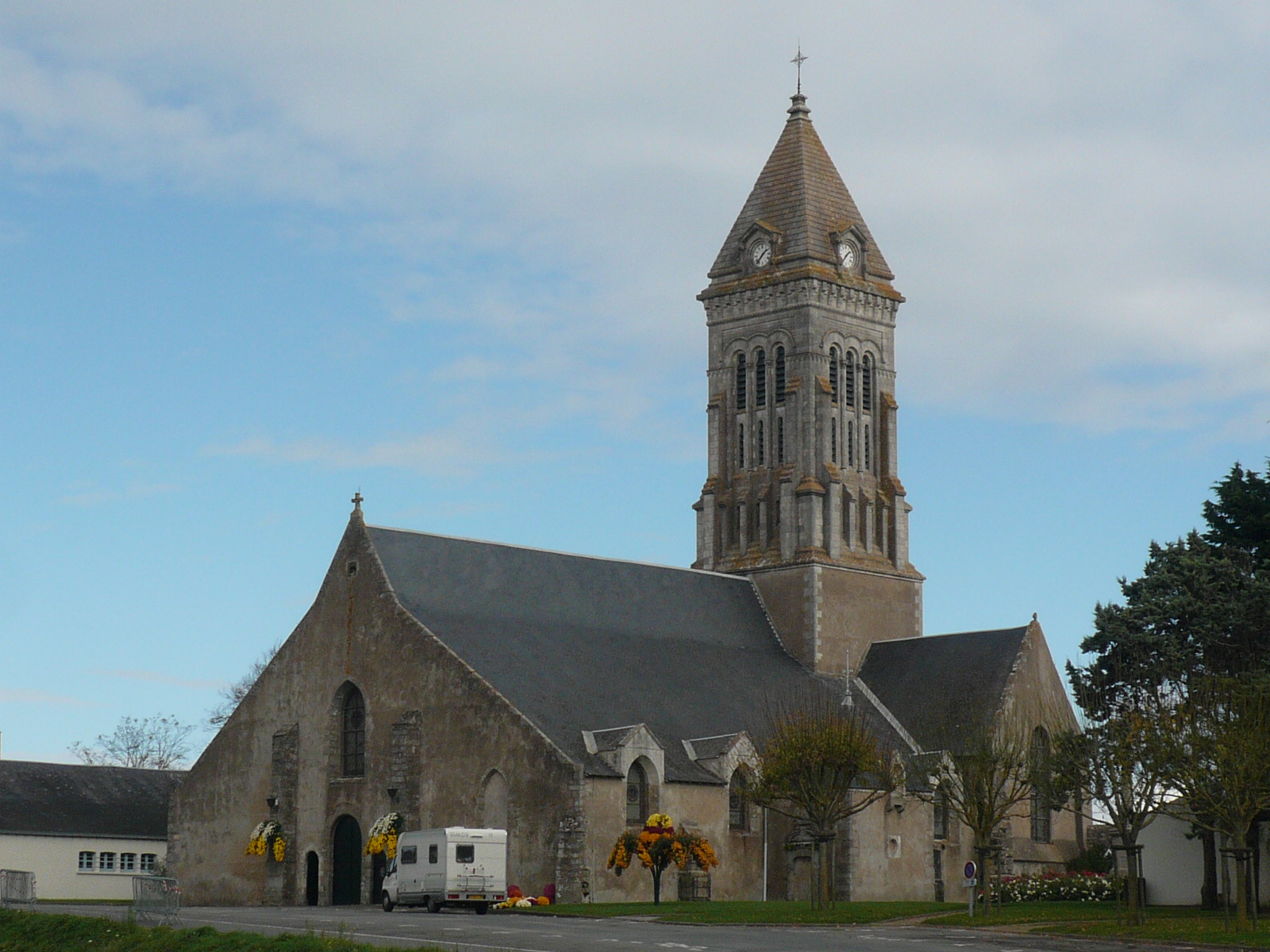
Parish Church of Noirmoutier

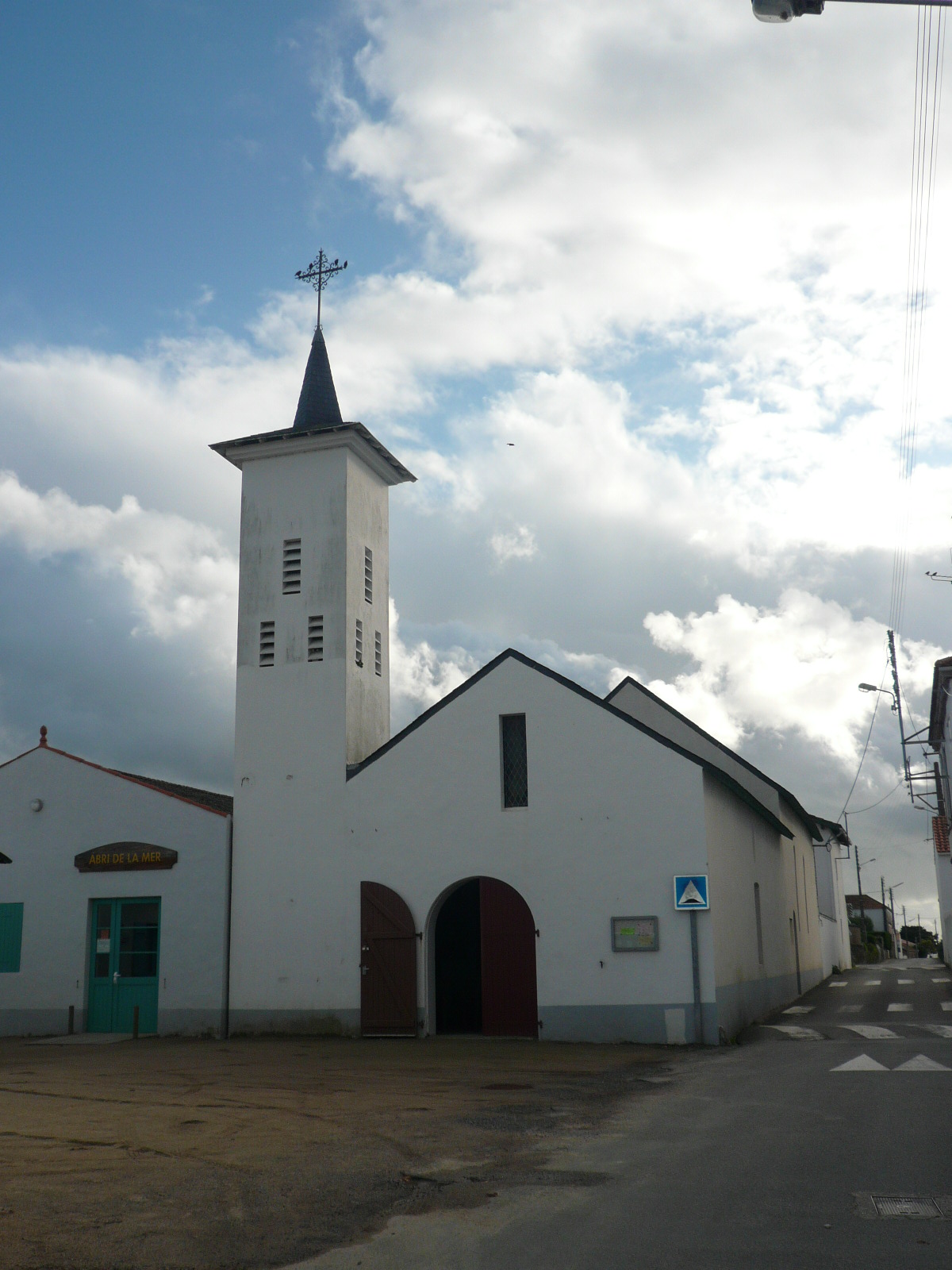
Chapelle de Le Vieil

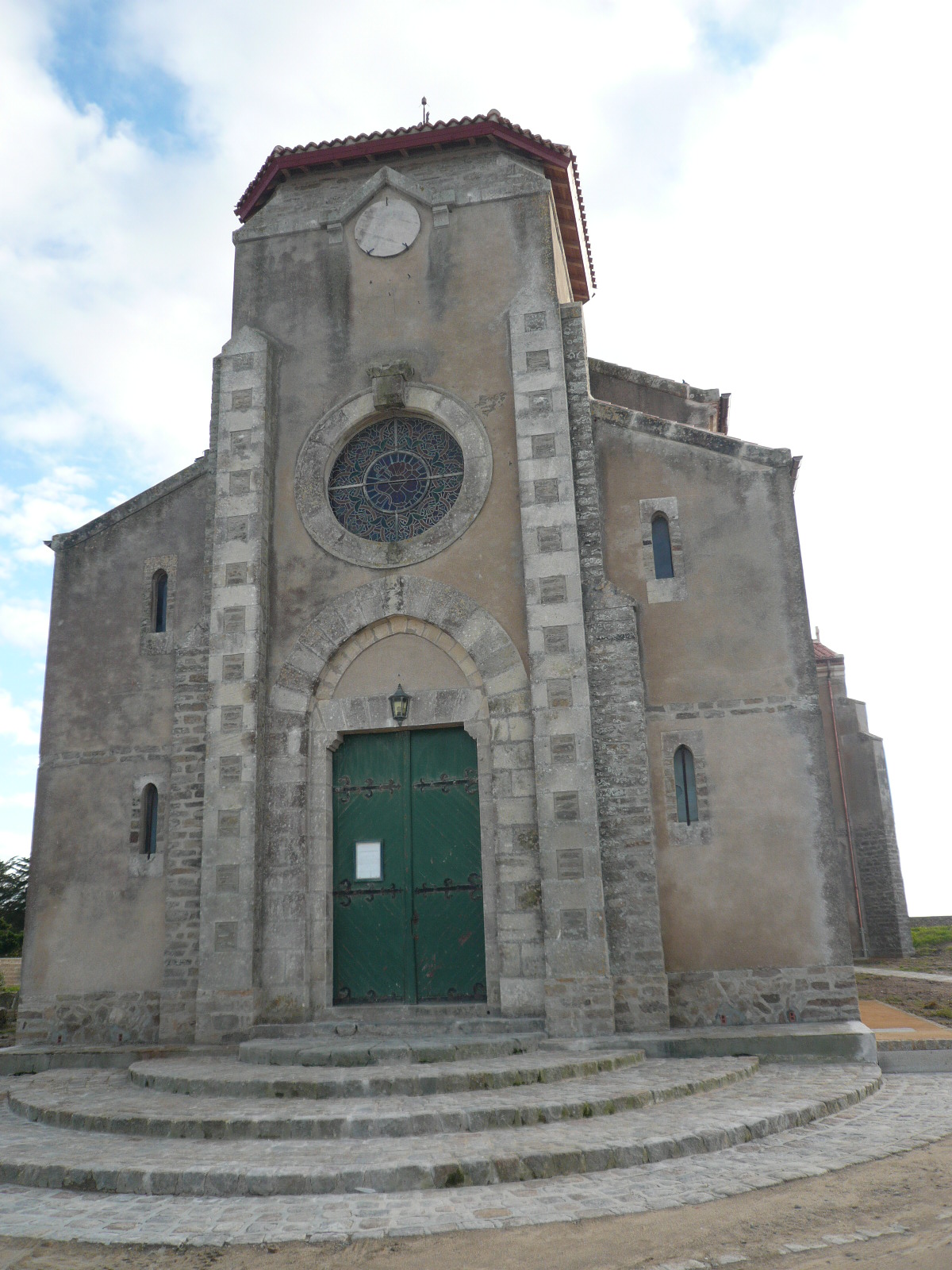
Eglise de l'Herbaudière

The Château de Noirmoutier is one of the town's major landmarks and is run by the commune government, It has been listed as a monument historique by the French Ministry of Culture since 1994.

The first traces of the castle appeared in 830 with the construction of a castrum by the abbot Hilbold, from the monastery of Saint-Philbert. It served to defend the monks and the island's population from the Vikings.

The castle was rebuilt in stone in the 12th century by the feudal power who was trying to stabilise the region, notably by preventing Norman pillaging. The island at that time was under the control of the barons of La Garnache. The keep was built by Pierre IV of La Garnache, then an enclosure equipped with towers was built around the lower courtyard. The castle resisted numerous attacks from the English in 1342 and 1360, and again in 1386 under the command of the Earl of Arundel. It fought off the Spanish in 1524 and 1588, but in 1674, it was taken by the Dutch troops of Admiral Tromp.

In the 16th century, the castle was held by the La Trémoille family, then viscounts of Thouars. The castle was sold in 1720 to Louis IV Henri de Bourbon-Condé who resold it in 1767 to Louis XV.

During the French Revolution, the castle served as a military prison. During the 19th century, the castle was used as a barracks. In 1871, during the Paris Commune, insurgents were imprisoned there. In 1960, a house was built within the castle grounds by the governor of the island and the castle. Today, the keep houses the Noirmoutier Museum.

The keep at the centre of the castle is solid and rectangular. Built of rubble, it has three floors with the lords' residence at the top. The keep has numerous murder holes and defensive turrets at the corners. The rectangular fortification consists of two towers, a single gate and two watch turrets in the four corners. At the beginning of the 18th century, the towers were reconstructed and the keep adapted for artillery.

The Parish Church of Noirmoutier is dedicated to St. Philbert, who founded a monastery here around 674. where the monks' s had taken refuge after the invasion of Normandy in 875. A shrine at the altar contains relics of the saint and was classified as a historical monument in 1898. The church was first destroyed by the Saracens in 725 and 732. When the son of Charlemagne, Louis the Pious became King of Aquitaine, he inherited the rights to the church and in 801 ordered the reconstruction of the abbey and chapel. Forty five years later it was again destroyed by the Normans in 846. It was then rebuilt at the end of 11th century but rather more primitively than previously. Centuries later, the aisles were raised and it was consecrated in 1849. The neo-Romanesque bell tower was built in 1875 to replace the old bell tower which was destroyed by fire in 1848.

On the inside is a model frigate, made by an artisan watchmaker of the village in 1802 for Augustus Jacobsen. The church received the body of St. Philbert some time between 690 and 836, when he was transferred to Saint-Philbert-de-Grand-Lieu, where the monks had taken refuge after the invasion of Normandy in 875. A shrine at the altar contains relics of the saint and was classified as a historical monument in 1898.

- Jacobsen Dam was built in 1812 by John Cornelius Jacobsen, descendant of a family of Dutch who came to the area in the eighteenth century . This dam has allowed the development of salt marsh s, creating a towpath and a channel to access the port. Along the channel is the graveyard of ships. On the other side of the pier, in the marshes is a noted bird habitat with waterfowl such as brant and little egret. At the end of the pier there are facilities for cycling and pedestrians.
- La chapelle de la Pitié : Meaning "The Chapel of Mercy": There is a stele in memory of Jacobsen, creator of the dam, and the events of 3 January 1794 are recalled, when the island was attacked by the Republican troops, who killed 1500 Vendée prisoners, despite promising to pardon them.
- L'Hôtel Jacobsen : The Jacobsen Hotel is the largest building of Noirmoutier. It was built between 1761 and 1766 by Cornils Guislain-Jacobsen who had been in the town since 1740.
- Hôtel Boucheron ou Lebreton des Grapillières': It was built in 1767, by the merchant François Boucheron. In 1790, the hotel became the property of the merchant Lebreton des Grapillières, who gave his name to the building. It was the headquarters of the customs administration in the nineteenth century, and tourist hotel called the Hotel d'Elba, after Napoleon's expulsion to Elba.
- Chapelle de Le Vieil
- Eglise de l'Herbaudière
- Noirmoutier-en-l'Île Sealand Aquarium
- Pointe aux Dames Lighthouse

== Culture ==
Robert Bresson's Lancelot du Lac (1974) is one of a number of films that have been shot on location in Noirmoutier-en-l'Île., and an exhibition dedicated to the town's role as a film location since the 1960s will be open at Château de Noirmoutier until November 2017.

== Sports ==
Noirmoutier-en-l'Île was the host for the Grand Départ(start) of the 2018 Tour de France.

== Personalities ==
- Pierre-Louis Lebreton (1752–1801), merchant, Mayor of Noirmoutier from 1792 to 1798.
- Édouard Richer, historian, specializing in the history of Brittany.

In memory of Jacobsen	Port	Town Hall	Noirmoutier-en-l'Île Sealand Aquarium

== Sister city ==
- Crestview, Florida, United States

== See also ==
- Communes of the Vendée department
- Church of Saint-Philbert-de-Grand-Lieu
