= Simon Sellier =

French bicycle racer

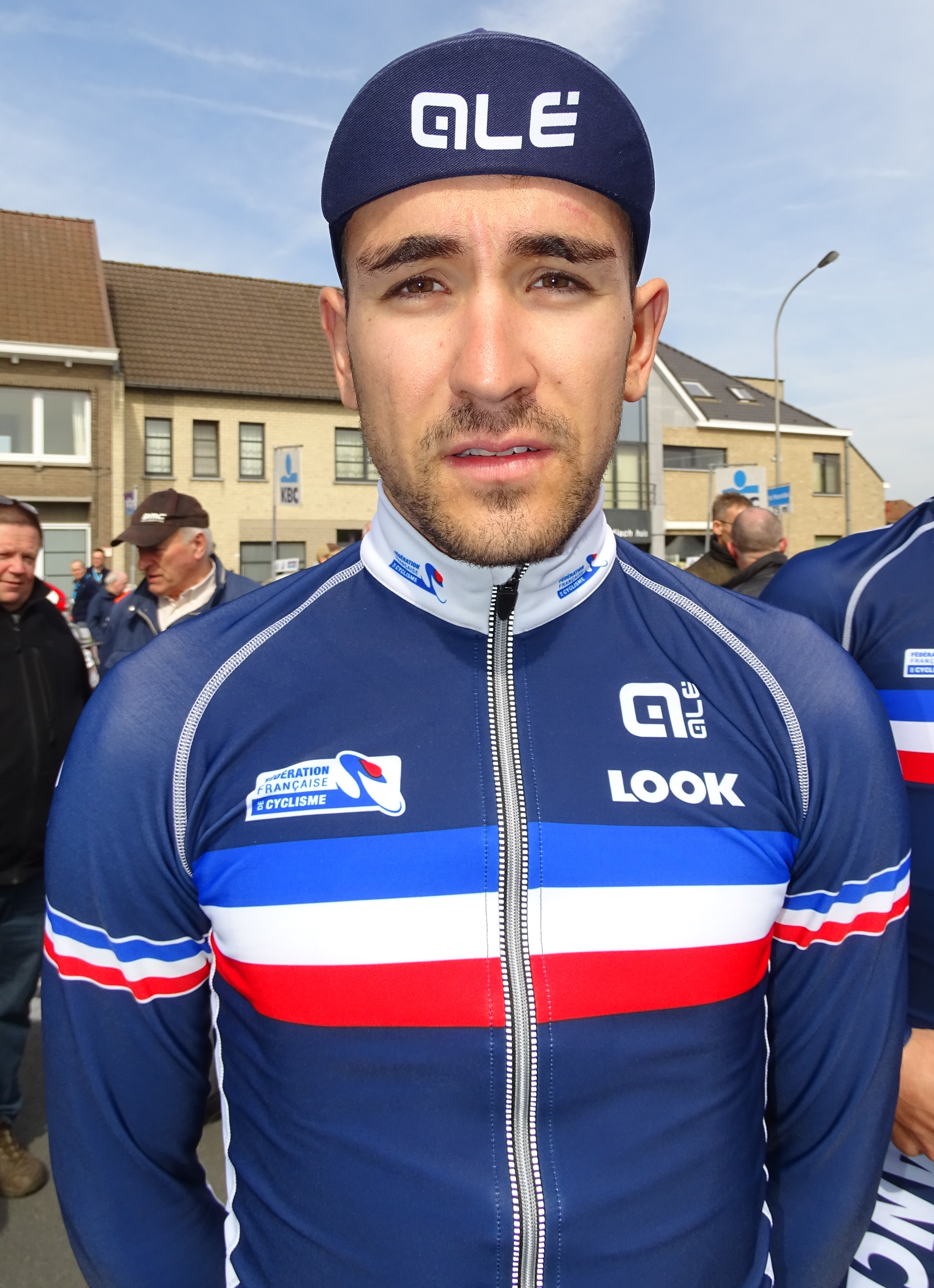
- Sellier in 2016.

Personal information
- Full name: Simon Sellier
- Born: 4 January 1995 (age 31) Le Perrier, France
- Height: 1.75 m (5 ft 9 in)
- Weight: 68 kg (150 lb)

Cycling career
- Sport: Cycling
- Current team: Retired
- Discipline: Road
- Role: Rider

Amateur teams
- 2014–2017: Vendée U
- 2015: Team Europcar (stagiaire)
- 2016: Direct Énergie (stagiaire)

Professional team
- 2018–2020: Direct Énergie

Simon Sellier (born 4 January 1995 in Le Perrier) is a French former professional cyclist, who rode professionally for the Total Direct Énergie team between 2018 and 2020.

== Major results ==
2017
4th Overall Tour du Maroc
4th Ghent–Wevelgem U23
