= Canton of Saint-Jean-de-Monts =

Coordinates: 46.79°N 2.06°W

Saint-Jean-de-Monts
- Canton
- Interactive map of Saint-Jean-de-Monts
- Country: France
- Region: Pays de la Loire
- Department: Vendée
- No. of communes: {{{nbcomm}}}

Government
  - Representatives (2021–2028): Amélie Riviere; Noël Faucher
- Area: 395.04 km^{2} (152.53 sq mi)
- Population (2023): 43,165
  - Density: 109.27/km^{2} (283.00/sq mi)
- INSEE code: 85 16

The canton of Saint-Jean-de-Monts is an administrative division of the Vendée department in western France. Its borders were modified at the French canton reorganisation which came into effect in March 2015. Its seat is in Saint-Jean-de-Monts.

== Composition ==
It consists of the following communes:

1. Barbâtre
2. La Barre-de-Monts
3. Beauvoir-sur-Mer
4. Bouin
5. L'Épine
6. La Guérinière
7. Noirmoutier-en-l'Île
8. Notre-Dame-de-Monts
9. Notre-Dame-de-Riez
10. Le Perrier
11. Saint-Gervais
12. Saint-Jean-de-Monts
13. Saint-Urbain
14. Soullans

== Councillors ==
Election	Councillors	Party	Occupation
2015	Martine Aury	CPNT	Councillor of Notre-Dame-de-Monts
2015	Noël Faucher	LR	Mayor of Noirmoutier-en-l'Île

== Pictures of the canton ==
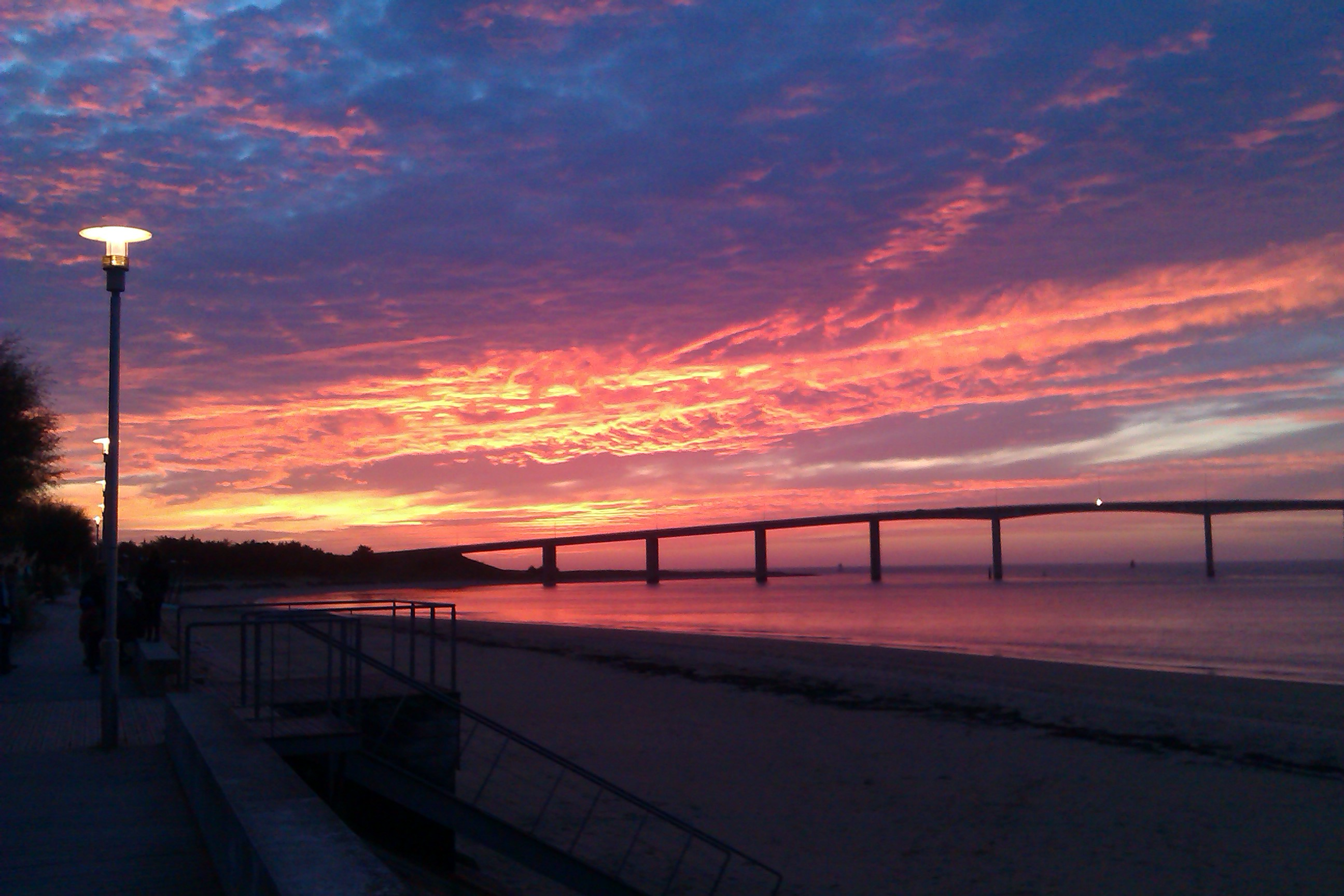
Sunset seen from Fromentine backfill

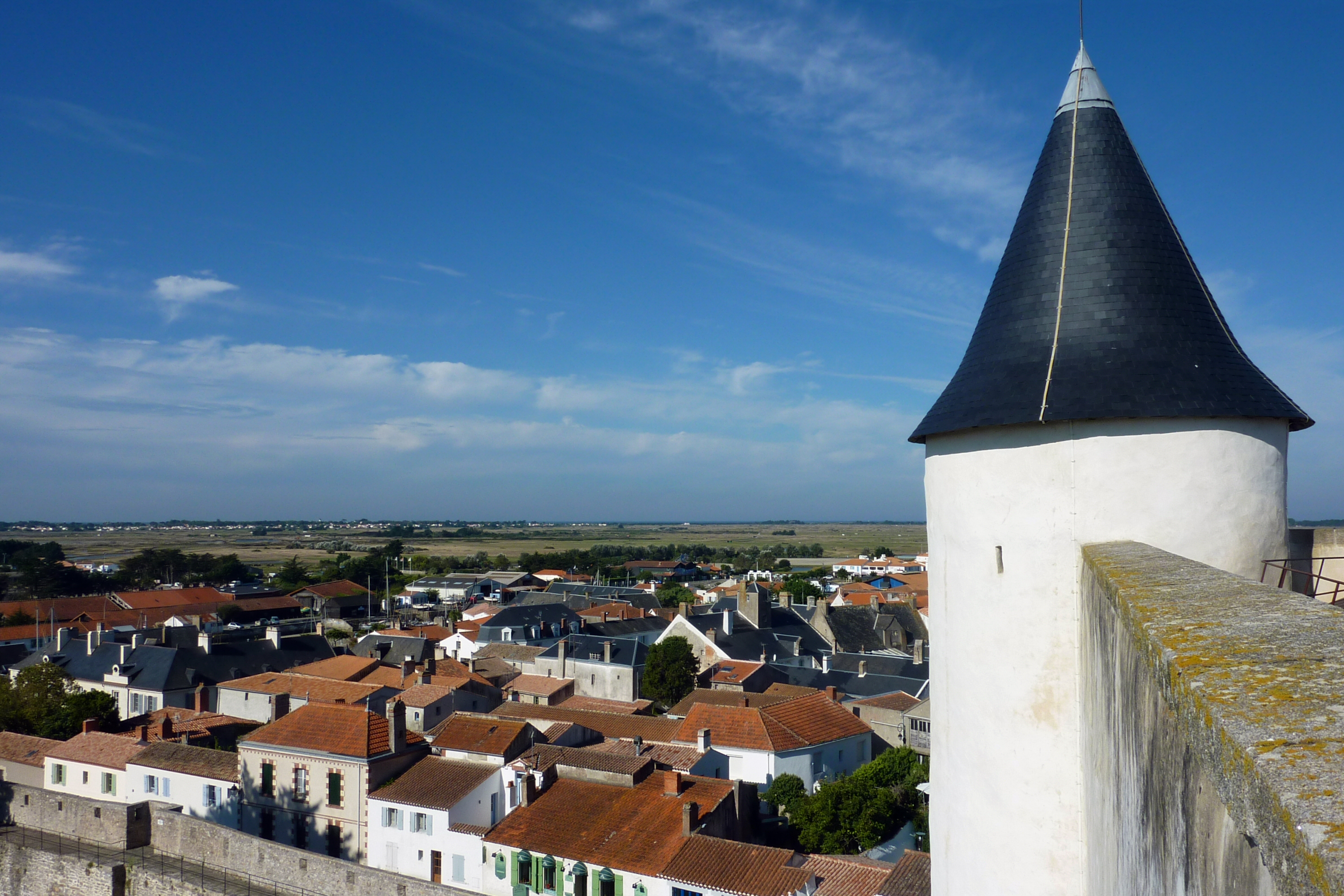
View of Noirmoutier-en-l'Île from the Noirmoutier's Castle

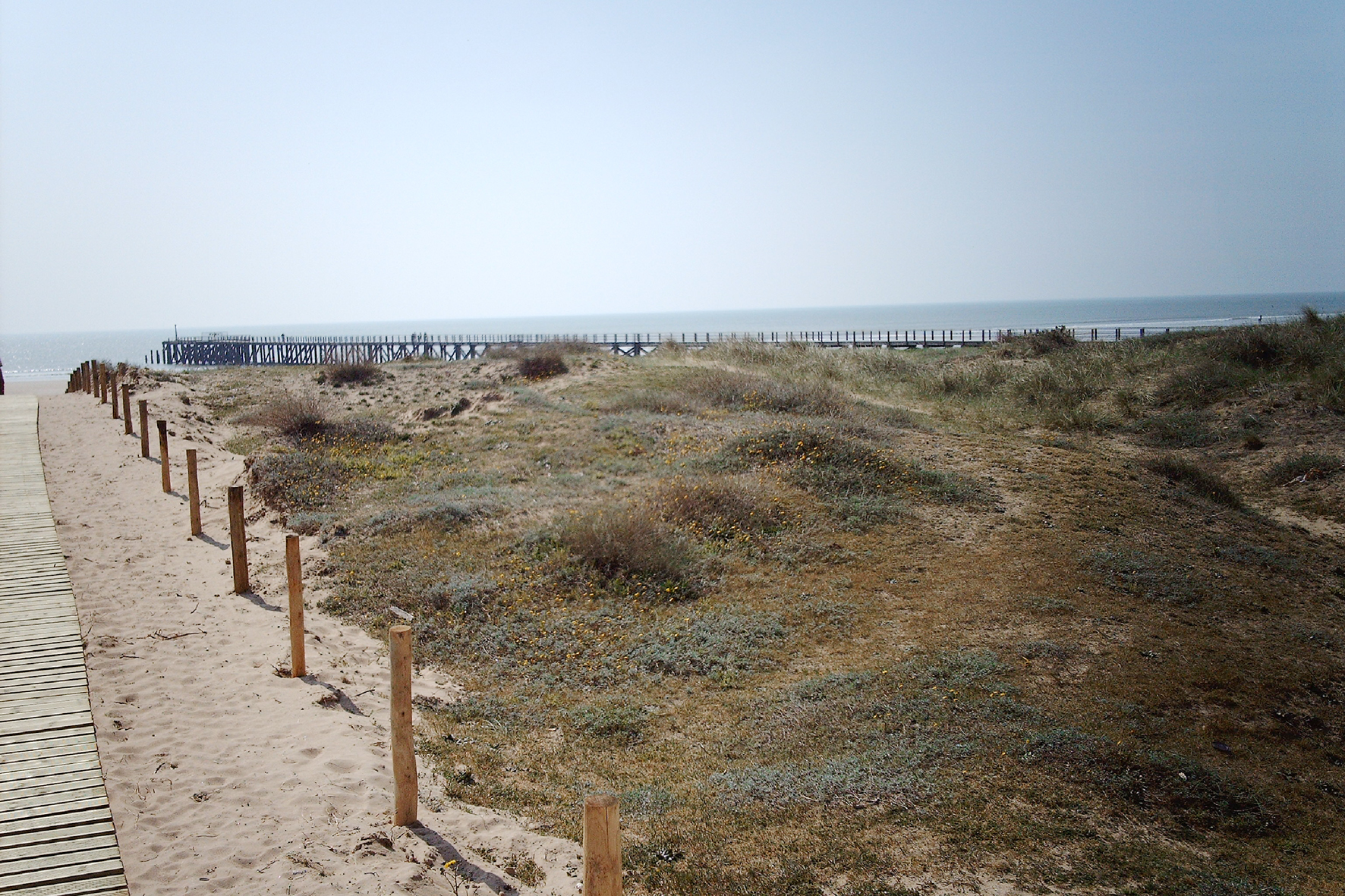
Saint-Jean-de-Monts's beach
