= Saint-Gervais, Vendée =

Saint-Gervais
- Commune
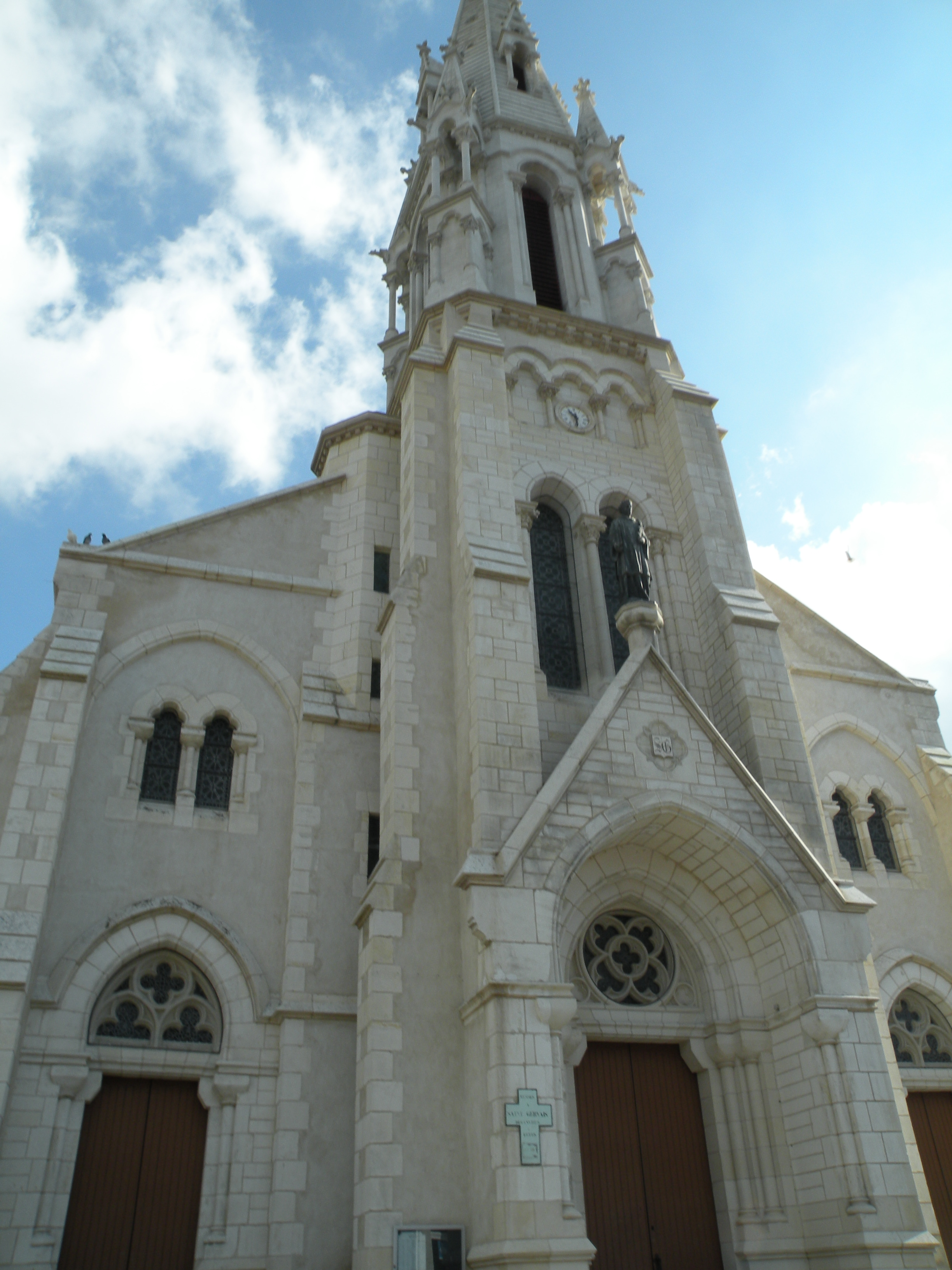
- The church in Saint-Gervais
- Location of Saint-Gervais
- Location within France Location within Pays de la Loire
- Coordinates: 46°54′09″N 1°59′50″W
- Country: France
- Region: Pays de la Loire
- Department: Vendée
- Arrondissement: Les Sables-d'Olonne
- Canton: Saint-Jean-de-Monts
- Intercommunality: Challans-Gois

Government
  - Mayor (2020–2026): Richard Sigwalt
- Area^{1}: 41.90 km^{2} (16.18 sq mi)
- Highest elevation: 34 m (112 ft)
- Lowest elevation: 1 m (3.3 ft)
- Population (2023): 2,781
  - Density: 66.37/km^{2} (171.9/sq mi)
- Time zone: UTC+01:00 (CET)
  - Summer (DST): UTC+02:00 (CEST)
- INSEE/Postal code: 85221 /85230
- ^{1} French Land Register data, which excludes lakes, ponds, glaciers > 1 km^{2} (0.386 sq mi or 247 acres) and river estuaries.

Saint-Gervais (French pronunciation: [sɛ̃ ʒɛʁvɛ]) is a commune in the Vendée department in the Pays de la Loire region in western France.

== Population ==
Historical population
Year	Pop.	±% p.a.
1968	1,415	—
1975	1,342	−0.75%
1982	1,446	+1.07%
1990	1,546	+0.84%
1999	1,648	+0.71%
2007	2,124	+3.22%
2012	2,382	+2.32%
2017	2,669	+2.30%
2023	2,781	+0.69%
Source: INSEE

== See also ==
- Communes of the Vendée department
