= La Guérinière =

- Commune
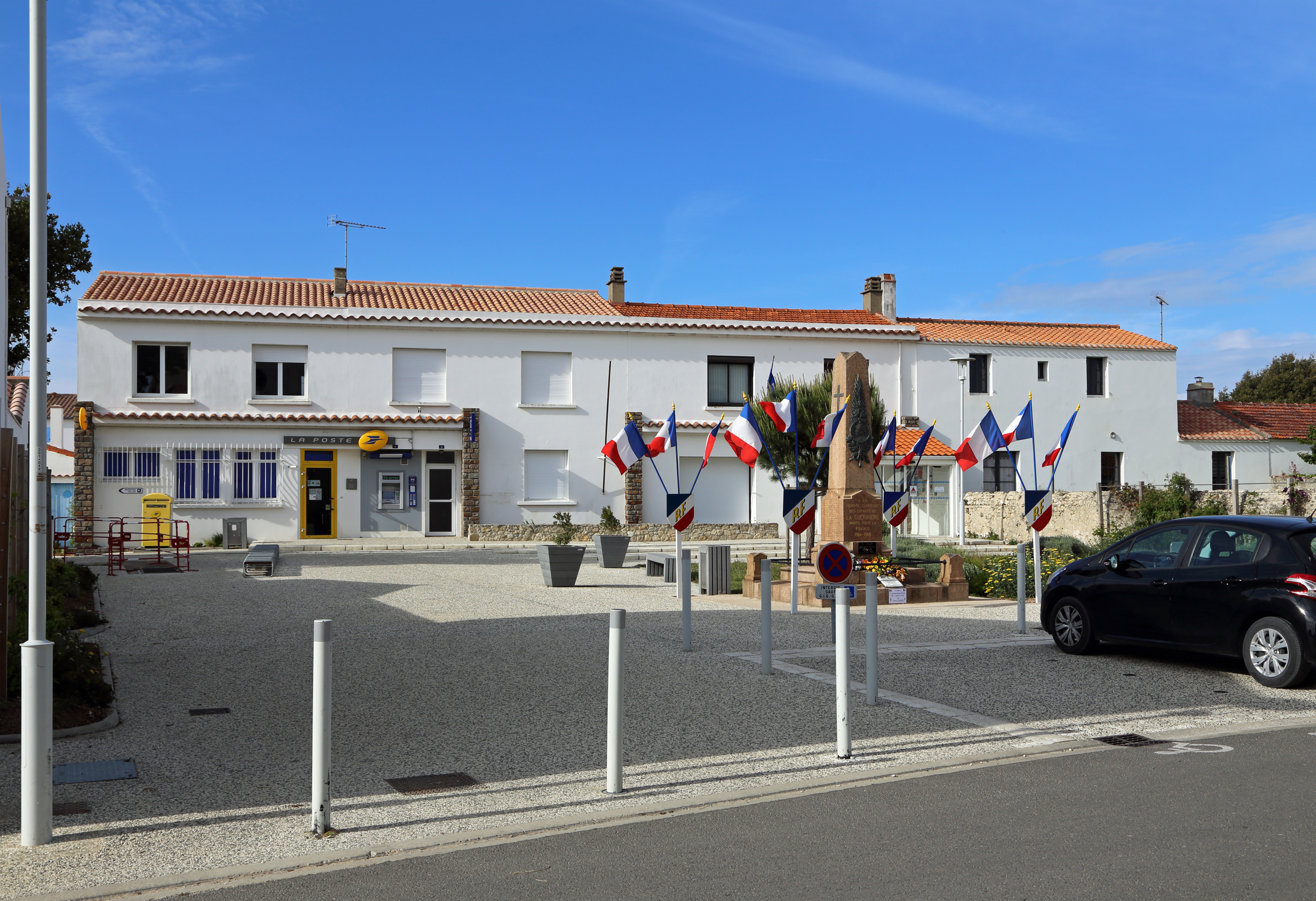
- Place de la Mairie at La Guérinière
- Location of La Guérinière
- Location within France Location within Pays de la Loire
- Coordinates: 46°58′05″N 2°13′49″W
- Country: France
- Region: Pays de la Loire
- Department: Vendée
- Arrondissement: Les Sables-d'Olonne
- Canton: Saint-Jean-de-Monts
- Intercommunality: L'île de Noirmoutier

Government
  - Mayor (2024–2026): Patrice Aubernon
- Area^{1}: 7.82 km^{2} (3.02 sq mi)
- Highest elevation: 20 m (66 ft)
- Lowest elevation: 0 m (0 ft)
- Population (2023): 1,377
  - Density: 176/km^{2} (456/sq mi)
- Time zone: UTC+01:00 (CET)
  - Summer (DST): UTC+02:00 (CEST)
- INSEE/Postal code: 85106 /85680
- ^{1} French Land Register data, which excludes lakes, ponds, glaciers > 1 km^{2} (0.386 sq mi or 247 acres) and river estuaries.

La Guérinière (French pronunciation: [la ɡeʁinjɛʁ]) is a commune in the Vendée department in the Pays de la Loire region in western France. It lies on the island of Noirmoutier. The town is protected from winter winds on the ocean side by a cordon of dunes.

== Geography ==
The altitude of the commune of La Guérinière lies between 0 and 20 meters. The area of the commune is 7.82 km^{2}. It lies 4 km south of Noirmoutier-en-l'Île, the nearest larger town.

== See also ==
- Communes of the Vendée department
