= Saint-Urbain, Vendée =

Saint-Urbain
- Commune
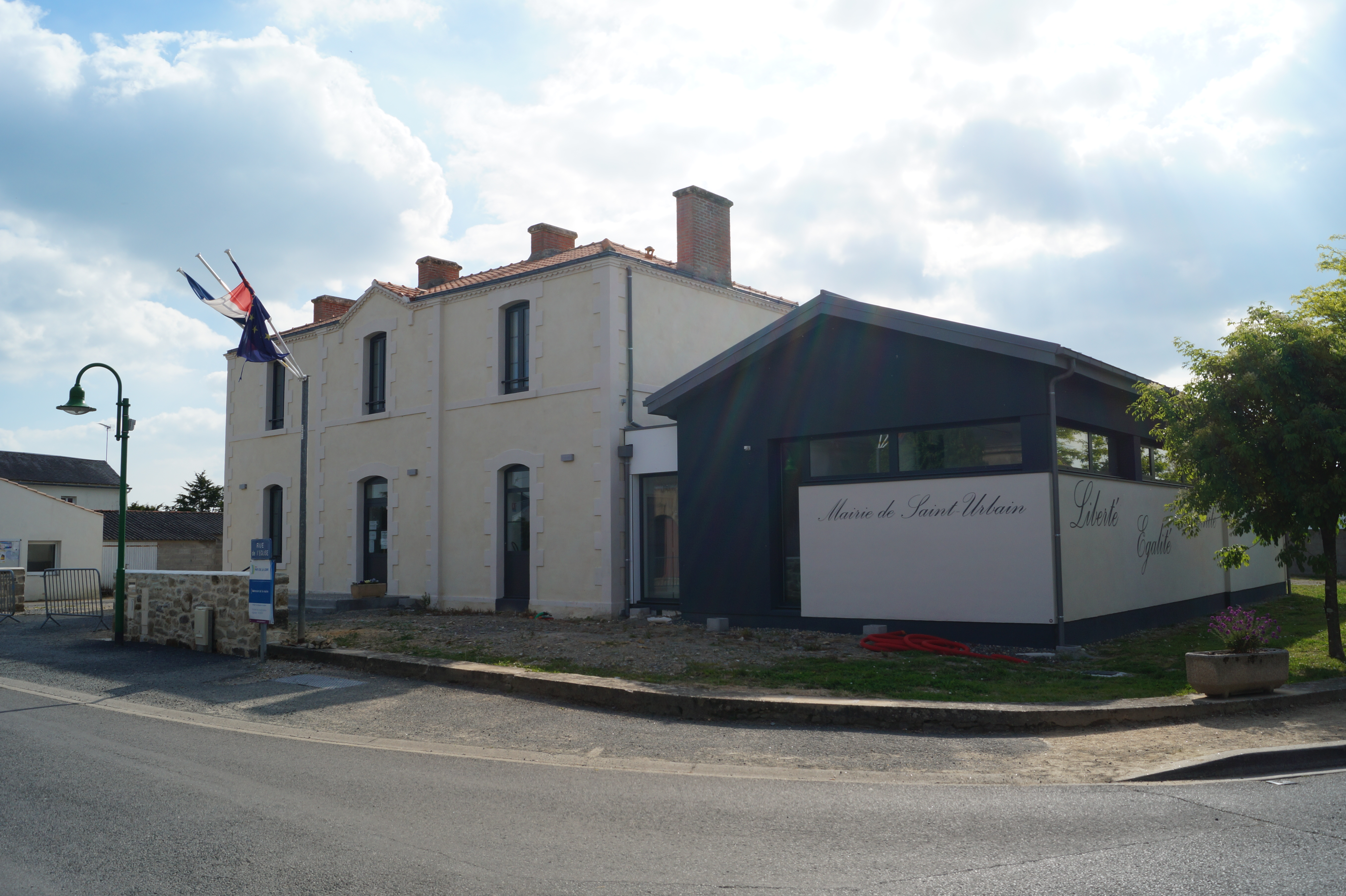
- Town hall of Saint-Urbain
- Location of Saint-Urbain
- Location within France Location within Pays de la Loire
- Coordinates: 46°52′36″N 2°00′28″W
- Country: France
- Region: Pays de la Loire
- Department: Vendée
- Arrondissement: Les Sables-d'Olonne
- Canton: Saint-Jean-de-Monts
- Intercommunality: Challans-Gois

Government
  - Mayor (2020–2026): Didier Buton
- Area^{1}: 16.39 km^{2} (6.33 sq mi)
- Highest elevation: 11 m (36 ft)
- Lowest elevation: 0 m (0 ft)
- Population (2023): 2,000
  - Density: 120/km^{2} (320/sq mi)
- Time zone: UTC+01:00 (CET)
  - Summer (DST): UTC+02:00 (CEST)
- INSEE/Postal code: 85273 /85230
- ^{1} French Land Register data, which excludes lakes, ponds, glaciers > 1 km^{2} (0.386 sq mi or 247 acres) and river estuaries.

Saint-Urbain (French pronunciation: [sɛ̃.t‿yʁbɛ̃]) is a commune in the Vendée department in the Pays de la Loire region in western France.

== Population ==
Historical population
| Year | Pop. | ±% p.a. |
|---|---|---|
| 1968 | 580 | — |
| 1975 | 562 | −0.45% |
| 1982 | 565 | +0.08% |
| 1990 | 621 | +1.19% |
| 1999 | 770 | +2.42% |
| 2007 | 1,341 | +7.18% |
| 2012 | 1,734 | +5.27% |
| 2017 | 1,818 | +0.95% |
| 2023 | 2,000 | +1.60% |
Source: INSEE

== See also ==
- Communes of the Vendée department
