= Château de Noirmoutier =

Castle in Pays de la Loire, France

Coordinates: 47°00′01″N 2°14′33″W

The Château de Noirmoutier is a castle on the Île de Noirmoutier in the Vendée département of France. It dominates the town of Noirmoutier-en-l'Île with its almost 20-metre-high (66 ft) keep. The castle is very well preserved and a fine example of 12th-century medieval architecture.

== History ==
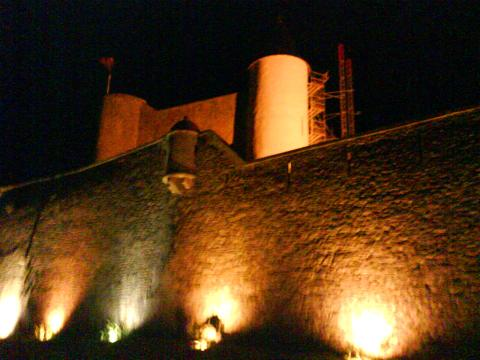
The Château de Noirmoutier by night in 2007

The first traces of the castle appeared in 830 with the construction of a castrum by the abbot Hilbold, from the monastery of Saint-Philbert. It served to defend the monks and the island's population from the Vikings.

The castle was rebuilt in stone in the 12th century by the feudal power who was trying to stabilise the region, notably by preventing Norman pillaging. The island at that time was under the control of the barons of La Garnache. The keep was built by Pierre IV of La Garnache, then an enclosure equipped with towers was built around the lower courtyard.

In the 16th century, the castle was held by the La Trémoille family, then viscounts of Thouars.

The castle resisted numerous attacks:

- the English in 1342 and 1360, and again in 1386 under the command of the Earl of Arundel
- the Spanish in 1524 and 1588

but in 1674, it was taken by the Dutch troops of Admiral Cornelis Tromp.

The castle was sold in 1720 to Louis IV Henri de Bourbon-Condé, who resold it in 1767 to Louis XV.

During the French Revolution, the castle was used as a military prison. During the 19th century, it was used as a barracks. In 1871, during the Paris Commune, insurgents were imprisoned there.

The castle was used to intern German nationals during the First World War.

In 1690, a house was built within the castle grounds by the governor of the island and the castle. Today, the keep houses the Noirmoutier Museum.

== Architecture ==
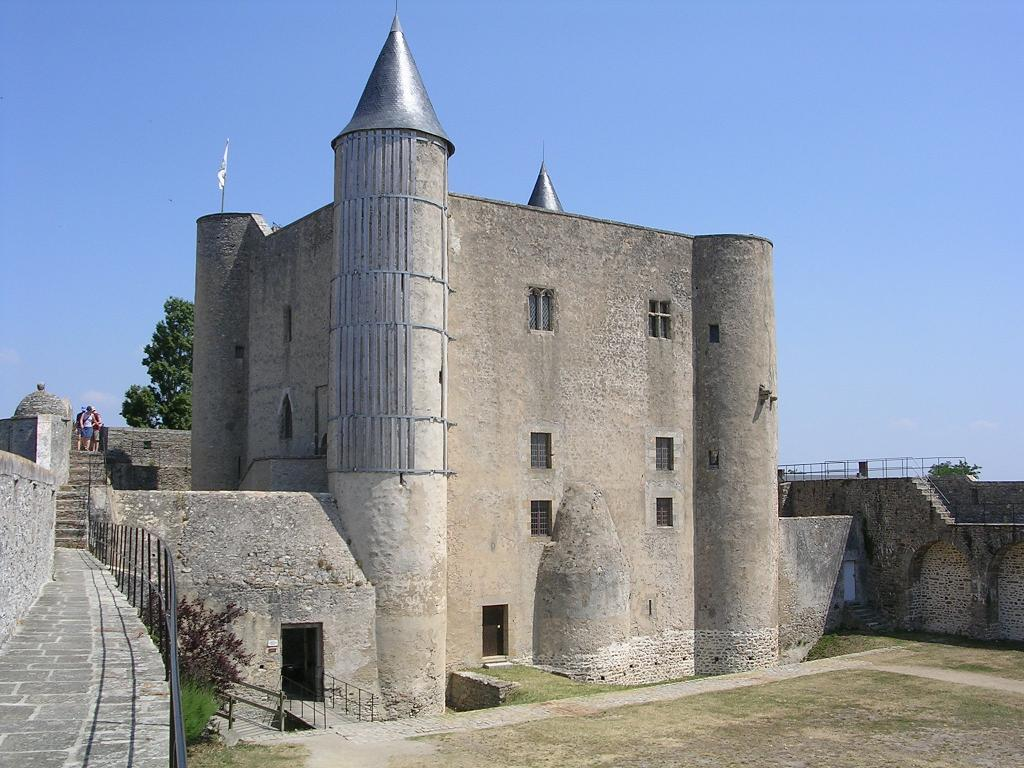
Keep of the Château de Noirmoutier

The keep at the centre of the castle is solid and rectangular. Built of rubble, it has three floors, with the lords' residence at the top. The keep has numerous murder holes and defensive turrets at the corners. The rectangular fortification consists of two towers, a single gate and two watch turrets in the four corners. At the beginning of the 18th century, the towers were reconstructed and the keep adapted for artillery.

Property of the commune, the Château de Noirmoutier is listed as a monument historique by the French Ministry of Culture.

== See also ==
- List of castles in France
