= L'Épine, Vendée =

L'Épine
- Commune
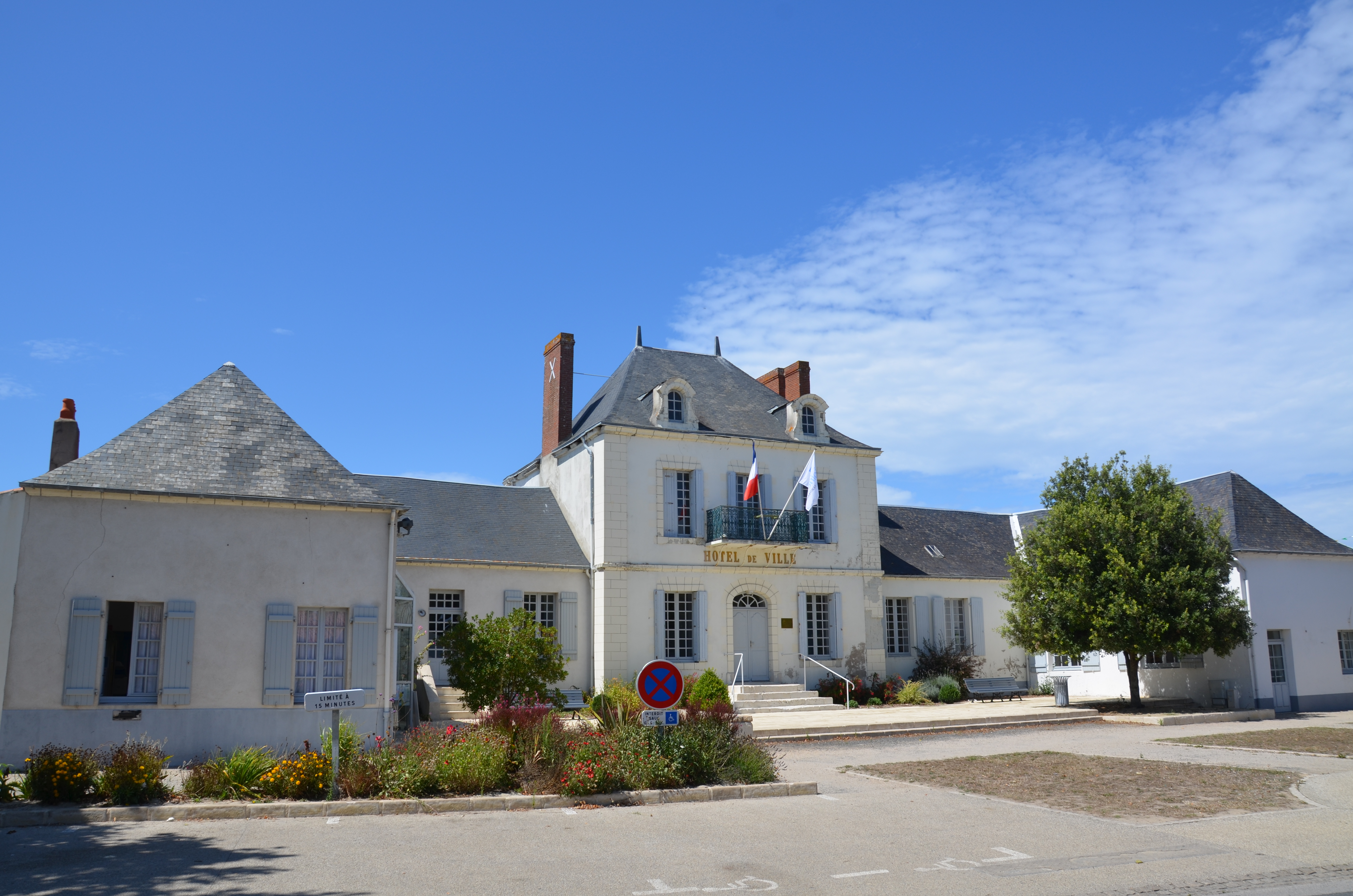

- Coat of arms
- Location of L'Épine
- Location within France Location within Pays de la Loire
- Coordinates: 46°58′46″N 2°16′01″W
- Country: France
- Region: Pays de la Loire
- Department: Vendée
- Arrondissement: Les Sables-d'Olonne
- Canton: Saint-Jean-de-Monts
- Intercommunality: l'île de Noirmoutier

Government
  - Mayor (2020–2026): Dominique Chantoin
- Area^{1}: 8.95 km^{2} (3.46 sq mi)
- Highest elevation: 17 m (56 ft)
- Lowest elevation: 0 m (0 ft)
- Population (2023): 1,636
  - Density: 183/km^{2} (473/sq mi)
- Time zone: UTC+01:00 (CET)
  - Summer (DST): UTC+02:00 (CEST)
- INSEE/Postal code: 85083 /85740
- ^{1} French Land Register data, which excludes lakes, ponds, glaciers > 1 km^{2} (0.386 sq mi or 247 acres) and river estuaries.

L'Épine (French pronunciation: [lepin]) is a commune in the Vendée department in the Pays de la Loire region in western France. It lies on the island of Noirmoutier.

== Geography ==
The altitude of the commune of L'Épine lies between 0 and 17 meters. The area of the commune is 8.95 km^{2}.

== See also ==
- Communes of the Vendée department
