= Le Perrier =

- Commune
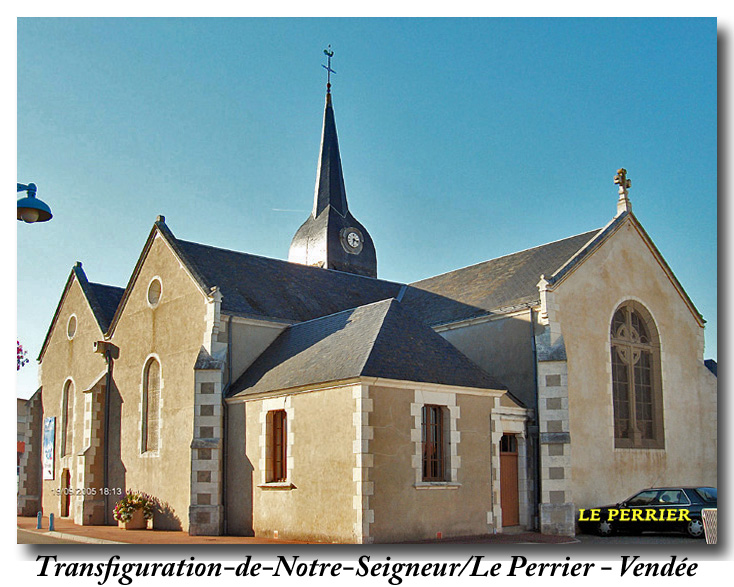
- The church of the Transfiguration of Our Lord, in Le Perrier

- Coat of arms
- Location of Le Perrier
- Location within France Location within Pays de la Loire
- Coordinates: 46°49′15″N 1°59′30″W
- Country: France
- Region: Pays de la Loire
- Department: Vendée
- Arrondissement: Les Sables-d'Olonne
- Canton: Saint-Jean-de-Monts
- Intercommunality: Océan marais de Monts

Government
  - Mayor (2020–2026): Maher Abu Aita
- Area^{1}: 33.22 km^{2} (12.83 sq mi)
- Highest elevation: 4 m (13 ft)
- Lowest elevation: 0 m (0 ft)
- Population (2023): 2,280
  - Density: 68.6/km^{2} (178/sq mi)
- Time zone: UTC+01:00 (CET)
  - Summer (DST): UTC+02:00 (CEST)
- INSEE/Postal code: 85172 /85300
- ^{1} French Land Register data, which excludes lakes, ponds, glaciers > 1 km^{2} (0.386 sq mi or 247 acres) and river estuaries.

Le Perrier (French pronunciation: [lə pɛʁje]) is a commune in the Vendée department in the Pays de la Loire region in western France.

== Geography ==
=== Climate ===
Le Perrier has an oceanic climate (Köppen climate classification Cfb). The average annual temperature in Le Perrier is 12.8 °C (55.0 °F). The average annual rainfall is 762.1 mm (30.00 in) with November as the wettest month. The temperatures are highest on average in July, at around 19.3 °C (66.7 °F), and lowest in January, at around 6.9 °C (44.4 °F). The highest temperature ever recorded in Le Perrier was 40.9 °C (105.6 °F) on 18 July 2022; the coldest temperature ever recorded was −10.2 °C (13.6 °F) on 2 January 1997.

Climate data for Le Perrier (1991−2020 normals, extremes 1990−present)
Month	Jan	Feb	Mar	Apr	May	Jun	Jul	Aug	Sep	Oct	Nov	Dec	Year
Record high °C (°F)	16.5 (61.7)	21.3 (70.3)	24.6 (76.3)	28.6 (83.5)	31.0 (87.8)	38.6 (101.5)	40.9 (105.6)	37.1 (98.8)	33.0 (91.4)	28.5 (83.3)	21.1 (70.0)	17.0 (62.6)	40.9 (105.6)
Mean daily maximum °C (°F)	9.8 (49.6)	10.5 (50.9)	13.2 (55.8)	15.7 (60.3)	19.1 (66.4)	22.3 (72.1)	24.1 (75.4)	24.4 (75.9)	21.9 (71.4)	17.7 (63.9)	13.4 (56.1)	10.5 (50.9)	16.9 (62.4)
Daily mean °C (°F)	6.9 (44.4)	7.1 (44.8)	9.3 (48.7)	11.4 (52.5)	14.6 (58.3)	17.6 (63.7)	19.3 (66.7)	19.3 (66.7)	16.8 (62.2)	13.8 (56.8)	9.9 (49.8)	7.5 (45.5)	12.8 (55.0)
Mean daily minimum °C (°F)	4.1 (39.4)	3.6 (38.5)	5.4 (41.7)	7.0 (44.6)	10.1 (50.2)	12.9 (55.2)	14.4 (57.9)	14.1 (57.4)	11.7 (53.1)	9.8 (49.6)	6.5 (43.7)	4.4 (39.9)	8.7 (47.7)
Record low °C (°F)	−10.2 (13.6)	−8.7 (16.3)	−8.5 (16.7)	−3.0 (26.6)	0.5 (32.9)	4.2 (39.6)	7.2 (45.0)	5.7 (42.3)	1.7 (35.1)	−5.0 (23.0)	−7.2 (19.0)	−9.0 (15.8)	−10.2 (13.6)
Average precipitation mm (inches)	80.3 (3.16)	61.9 (2.44)	51.4 (2.02)	56.1 (2.21)	52.3 (2.06)	43.1 (1.70)	36.9 (1.45)	44.1 (1.74)	63.2 (2.49)	91.5 (3.60)	92.2 (3.63)	89.1 (3.51)	762.1 (30.00)
Average precipitation days (≥ 1.0 mm)	12.6	10.4	8.8	9.5	8.0	6.8	7.0	6.8	7.7	11.5	13.1	13.5	115.7
Source: Météo-France

== Population ==
Historical population
Year	Pop.	±% p.a.
1968	1,257	—
1975	1,218	−0.45%
1982	1,385	+1.85%
1990	1,532	+1.27%
1999	1,506	−0.19%
2007	1,797	+2.23%
2012	1,869	+0.79%
2017	2,023	+1.60%
2023	2,280	+2.01%
Source: INSEE

== See also ==
- Communes of the Vendée department
