= Notre-Dame-de-Monts =

- Commune
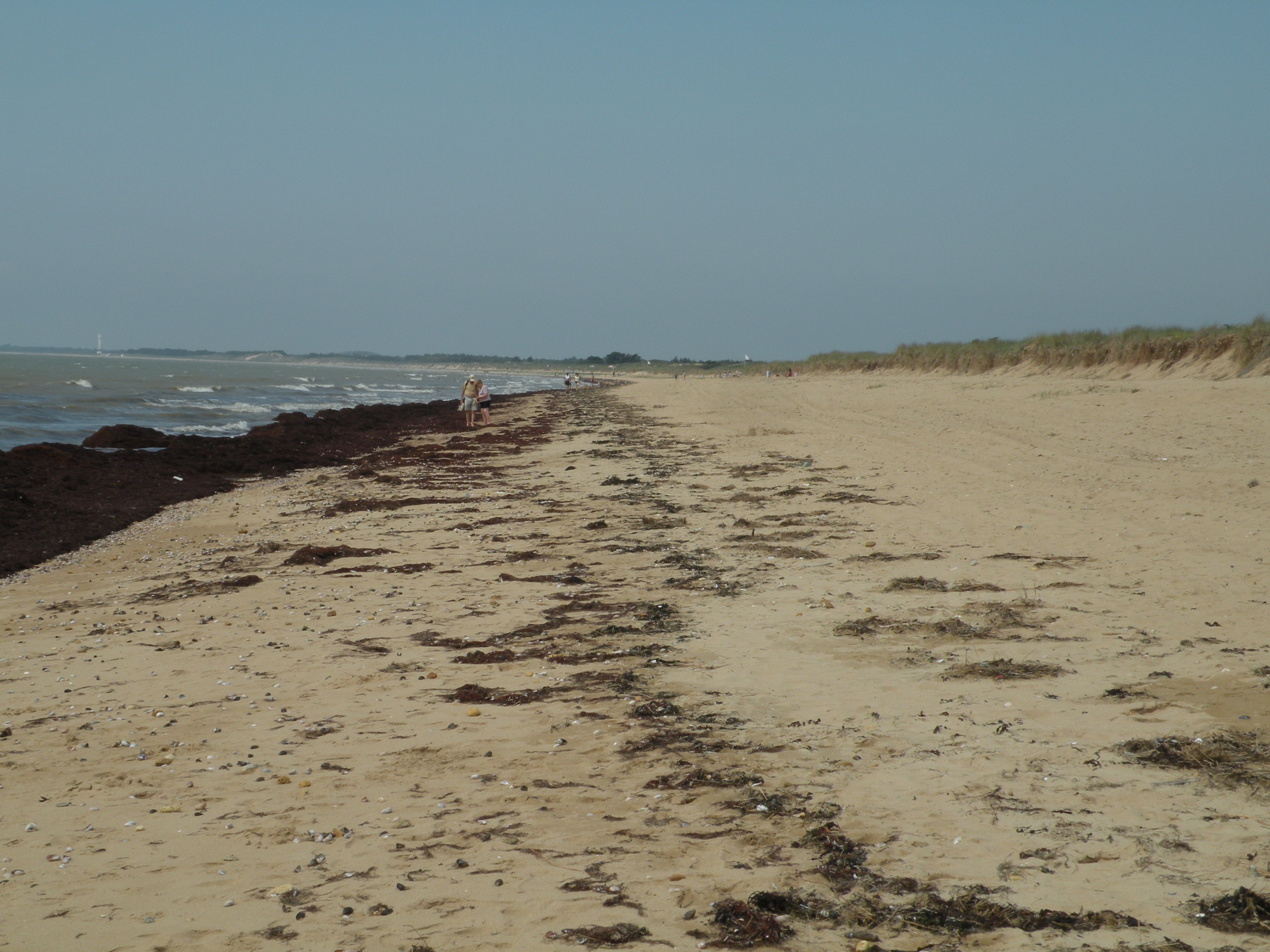
- La Braie beach, in Notre-Dame-de-Monts

- Coat of arms
- Location of Notre-Dame-de-Monts
- Location within France Location within Pays de la Loire
- Coordinates: 46°49′53″N 2°07′50″W
- Country: France
- Region: Pays de la Loire
- Department: Vendée
- Arrondissement: Les Sables-d'Olonne
- Canton: Saint-Jean-de-Monts
- Intercommunality: Océan marais de Monts

Government
  - Mayor (2020–2026): Raoul Grondin
- Area^{1}: 20.62 km^{2} (7.96 sq mi)
- Highest elevation: 20 m (66 ft)
- Lowest elevation: 1 m (3.3 ft)
- Population (2023): 2,420
  - Density: 117/km^{2} (304/sq mi)
- Time zone: UTC+01:00 (CET)
  - Summer (DST): UTC+02:00 (CEST)
- INSEE/Postal code: 85164 /85690
- ^{1} French Land Register data, which excludes lakes, ponds, glaciers > 1 km^{2} (0.386 sq mi or 247 acres) and river estuaries.

Notre-Dame-de-Monts (French pronunciation: [nɔtʁ dam də mɔ̃]) is a commune in the Vendée department in the Pays de la Loire region in western France.

== Population ==
Historical population
Year	Pop.	±% p.a.
1968	1,349	—
1975	1,376	+0.28%
1982	1,325	−0.54%
1990	1,333	+0.08%
1999	1,528	+1.53%
2007	1,806	+2.11%
2012	1,956	+1.61%
2017	2,105	+1.48%
2023	2,420	+2.35%
Source: INSEE

== See also ==
- Communes of the Vendée department
