= Battle of Noirmoutier (1794) =

- Part of the War in the Vendée
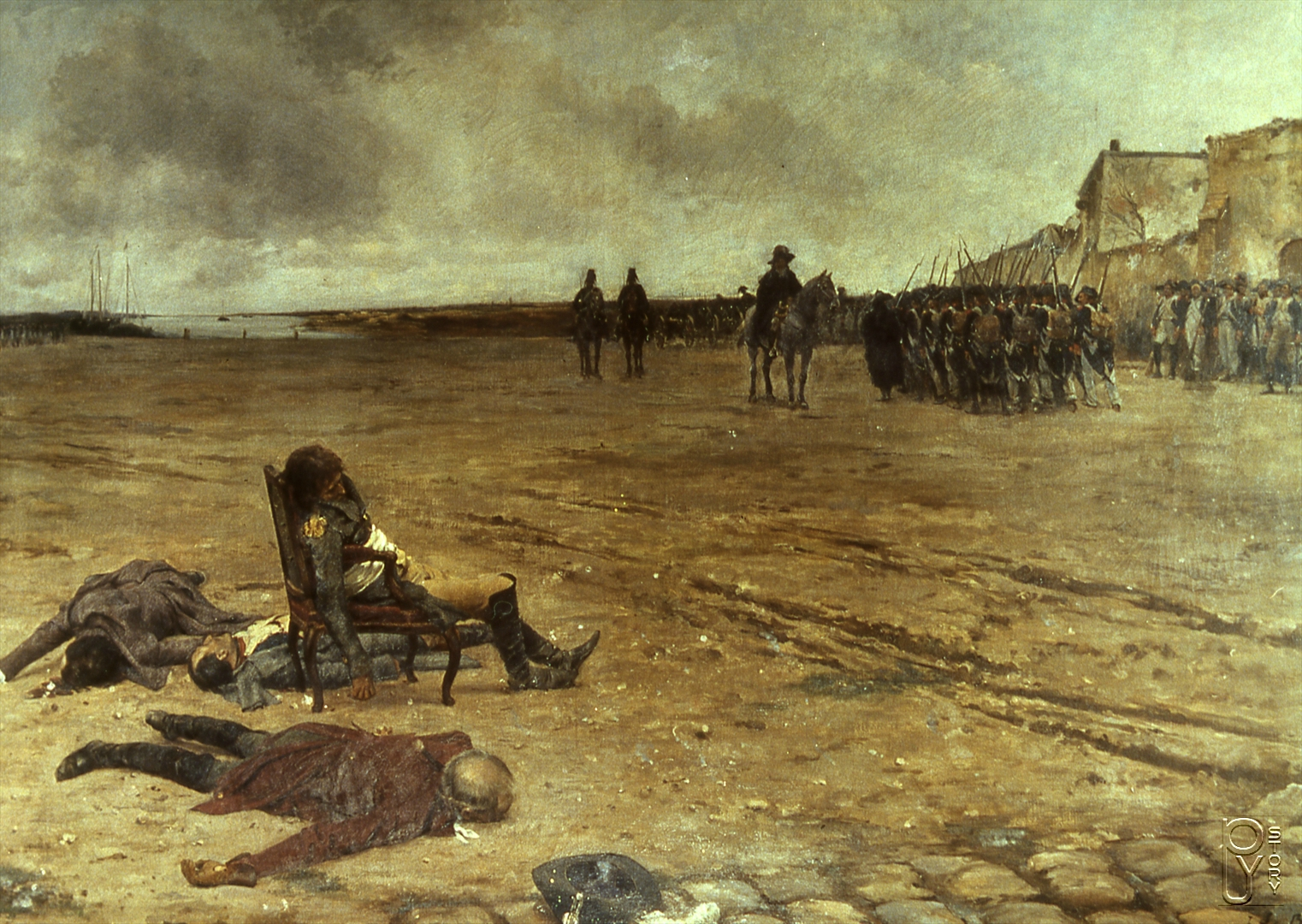
- The death of General d'Elbée; Julien Le Blant, 1878
Date	3 January 1794
Location	Noirmoutier, Vendée 46°59′32.65″N 2°15′19.74″W
Result	French Republican victory

Belligerents
(France) French Republic	Vendeans

Commanders and leaders
Louis Marie Turreau; Nicolas Haxo; Nicolas Louis Jordy; Dominique Aubertin; Prieur de la Marne; Pierre Bourbotte	Maurice d'Elbée (executed); René de Tinguy (executed); Alexandre Pineau du Pavillon (executed); Bernard Massip (executed); Hyacinthe Hervouët de La Robrie (executed); Benjamin Dubois de La Guignardière (executed); Pierre Prosper Gouffier de Boisy (executed); Pierre Duhoux d'Hauterive (executed)

Strength
3,000 to 3,200 men	1,500 to 2,000 men

Casualties and losses
130 dead 200 wounded	400 to 600 dead 1 200 to 1,500 prisoners shot 30 to 100 cannons and screeches captured
- Location within France

The Battle of Noirmoutier was a confrontation in the War in the Vendée which took place on 3 January 1794 between the Republicans and the Vendeans for control of the island of Noirmoutier. Situated in the Bay of Bourgneuf and linked to the mainland by the Gois causeway, the island was occupied on 12 October 1793 by General Charette's Vendean troops. This capture immediately alarmed the Committee of Public Safety, which feared Britain intervening on behalf of the royalists. However, Charette did not attempt to send a schooner to Britain until December to make contact with the British government, and he received no reply for several months.

The republicans landed on Noirmoutier on the morning of 3 January 1794 and took the whole of its southern part after fighting at Pointe de la Fosse and the village of Barbâtre. They then marched in the afternoon towards the town of Noirmoutier, where they received the capitulation of the Vendeans, who laid down their arms against the promise of their lives. Accepted by General Haxo, the capitulation was not respected by the representatives on a mission, Prieur de la Marne, Turreau and Bourbotte, who had 1,200 to 1,500 prisoners shot in a few days, including Maurice d'Elbée, the former generalissimo of the Catholic and Royal Army.

The recapture of Noirmoutier followed the battle of Savenay a few days later, which saw the destruction of the Vendean forces engaged in the Galerne's campaign. After these two victories, which were considered decisive, the Republican commanders believed that the War in the Vendée was on the point of being over. The Vendeans no longer control any territory and the last insurgent bands are numbered by only a few hundred or a few thousand men, hunted down in the woods and in the countryside. In mid-January, Turreau launched his infernal columns with the intention of giving the final blow to the Vendean insurrection.

== Context ==
=== Capture of Noirmoutier by the Vendeans ===
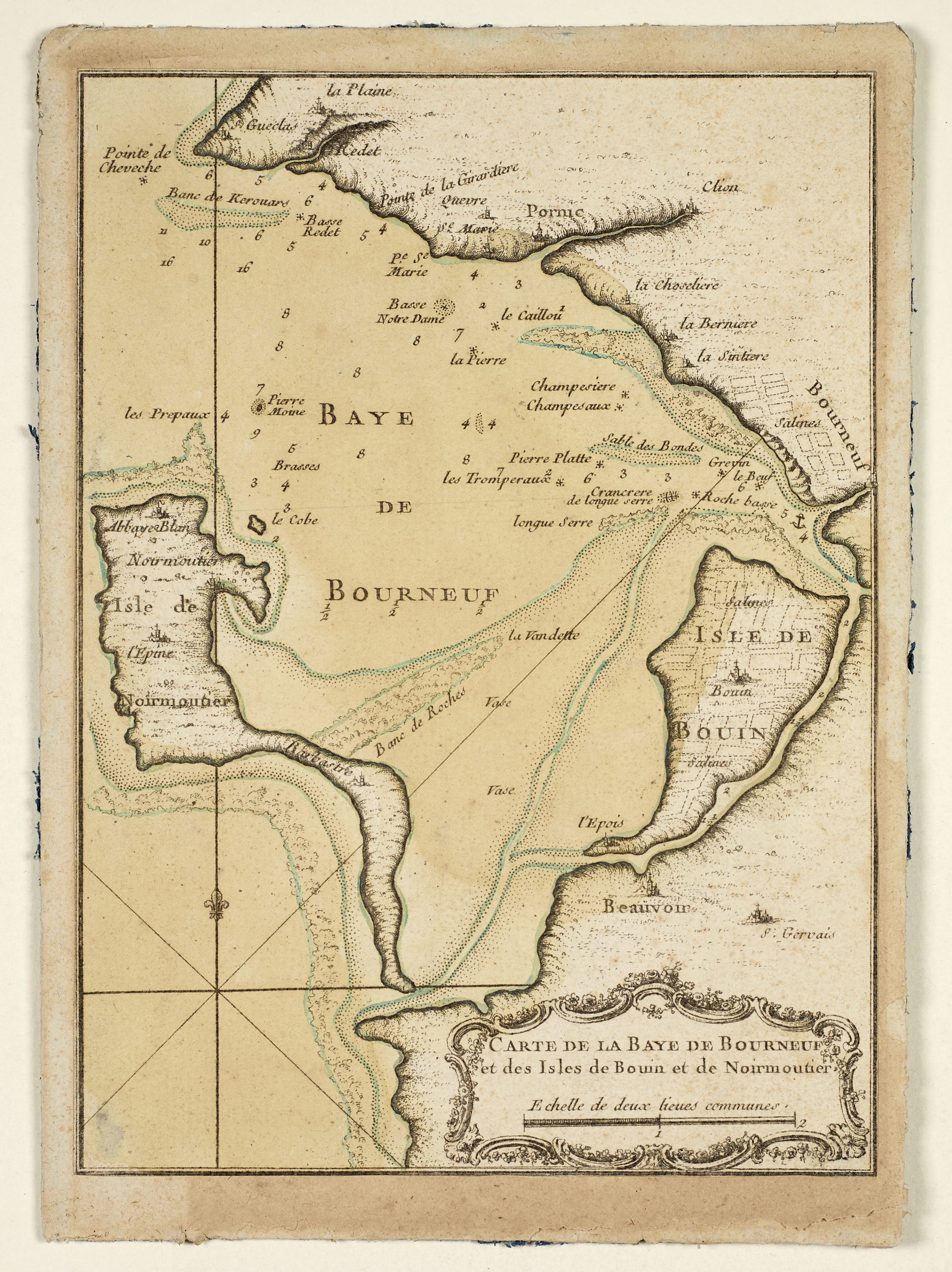
Map of Bourgneuf Bay and the islands of Noirmoutier and Bouin, 1764, Museum of Brittany.

The island of Noirmoutier changed hands several times during the War in the Vendée. Located in the Bay of Bourgneuf not far from the island of Bouin, accessible from land by the Gois causeway, a 5 kilometres long submersible road that can be walked on during low tides, which connects the island to the mainland by the port of Cronière, in the commune of Beauvoir-sur-Mer. Noirmoutier is divided into two parishes: to the north, the town of Noirmoutier-en-l'Île, also called Saint-Philbert de Noirmoutier, with a population of 3,675 in 1791, and to the south the village of Barbâtre, with a population of 2,221 in 1791. The north of the island, from La Guérinière to l'Herbaudière, consists of salt marshes. The south, from La Guérinière to Pointe de la Fosse, is covered with sand, arable land and Vines.

Noirmoutier first fell to the insurgents on 19 March 1793, when peasant farmers led by Joseph Guerry de La Fortinière crossed the Gois causeway and occupied the island without resistance.

However, in April, the republicans retook the towns of Challans and Machecoul and reached the outskirts of the island. After summons from General Beysser and the landing of 200 men from the ship Le Superbe, from the squadron of the Rear Admiral Villaret de Joyeuse, the inhabitants of Noirmoutier made their submission on 29 April. The insurgent leaders René Augustin Guerry and Rorthais des Chataigners were arrested and sent to Nantes, but Guerry de la Fortinière, Tinguy and the knight of Régnier managed to escape.

However, in June, the Vendeans recaptured Challans and Machecoul and were once again able to threaten Noirmoutier. After a first unsuccessful attempt on 30 September, General Charette's army, aided by the inhabitants of Barbâtre, took the island on 12 October. The weak Republican garrison offered little resistance and capitulated. Charette formed a royalist administration in Noirmoutier and left some of his troops there before leaving after three days. The Republican prisoners were sent to Bouin where the local chief, François Pajot, had several hundreds of them massacred on 17 and 18 October.

=== Republican attack against Charette ===
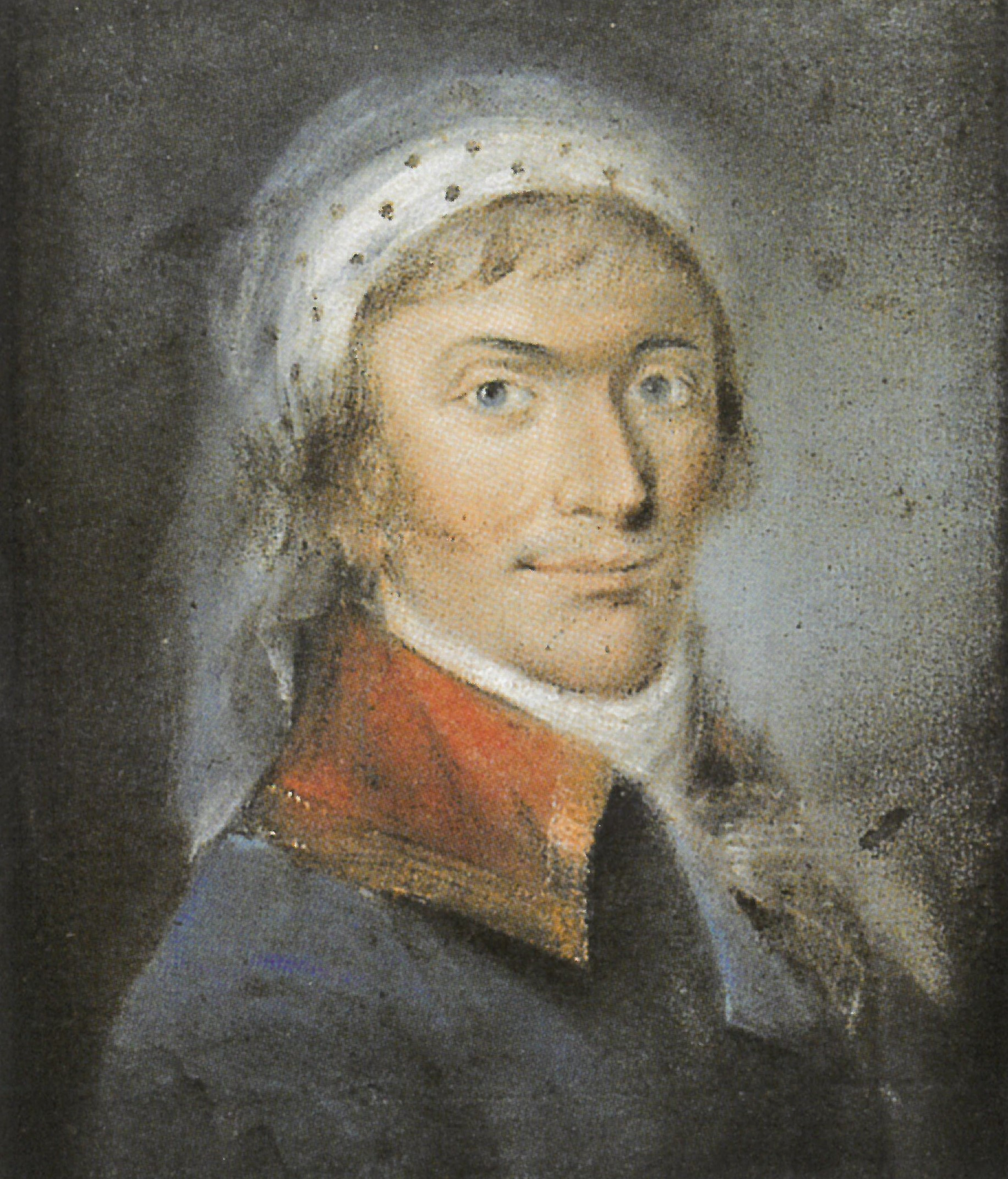
Portrait of François Athanase Charette de La Contrie, anonymous pastel, between 1793 and 1796.

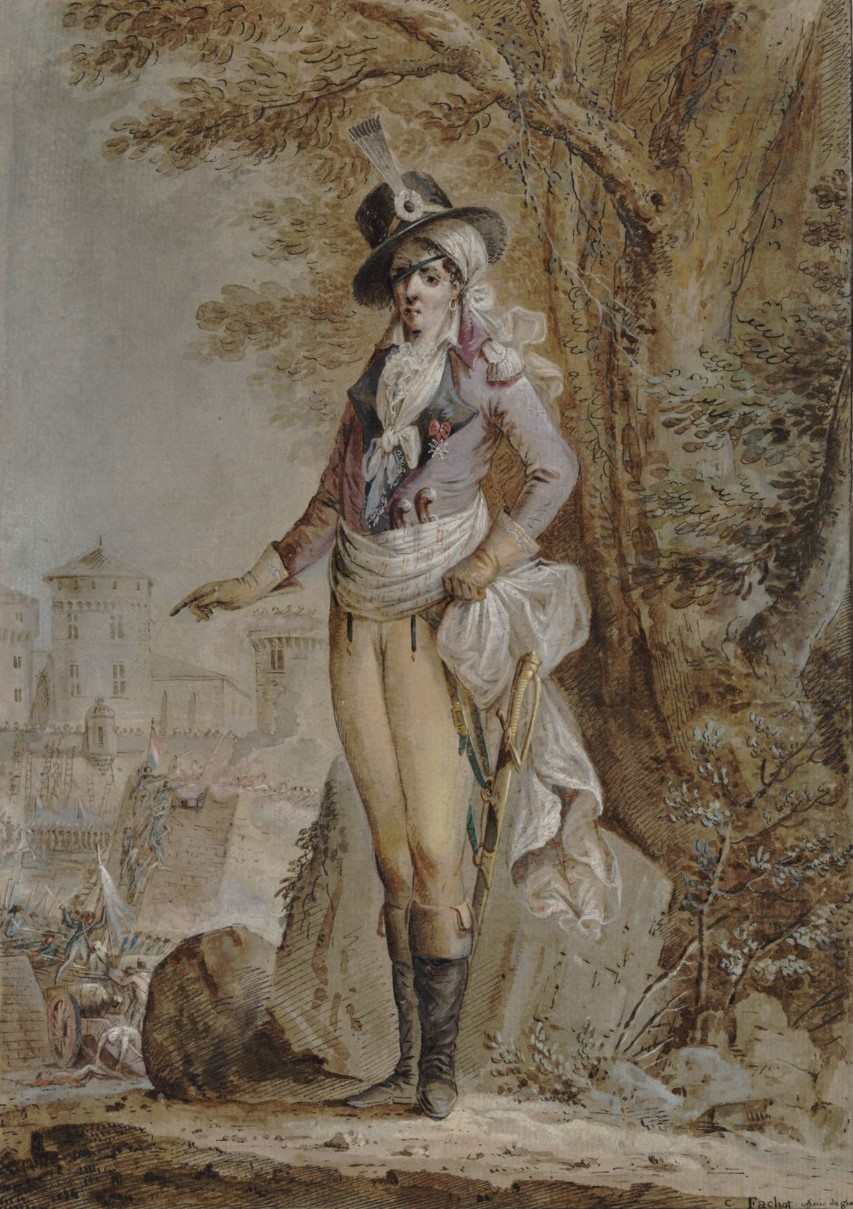
D'Elbée: one of the main leaders of the royal and Catholic army of the brigands of the Vendée, taken and shot after the capture of the Isle of Noirmoutier. Drawn from life at the council of war during his interrogation on 14 Nivôse, Year II by citizen Fachot, staff officer and captain of the engineers, 1794, Bibliothèque nationale de France.

In October 1793, the military situation in the Vendée was to the advantage of the Republicans. The army of the west concentrated its efforts on the army of Anjou and Haut-Poitou, commanded by the generalissimo Maurice d'Elbée, which was defeated on 17 October at the battle of Cholet. The "Galerne campaign" then began: the bulk of the royalist and republican forces moved north of the Loire and clashed until December in Maine, Brittany and Normandy. Despite the several appeals for help sent by d'Elbée, Charette and the other chiefs of Pays de Retz and Bas-Poitou remained aloof from these events.

Meanwhile, in Paris, the news of the capture of the island of Noirmoutier aroused the concern of the Committee of Public Safety, which feared that it would allow the Vendeans to receive help from the British. On 18 October, the executive council received a decree signed by Barère, Prieur de la Côte d'Or, Collot d'Herbois, Billaud-Varenne, Robespierre and Hérault de Séchelles ordering it to "take all necessary measures to attack the island of Noirmoutier as soon as possible, to chase away the brigands and to ensure possession of the island by the Republic". On 21 October, the Committee of Public Safety enjoins the representatives on a mission, Prieur de la Marne and Jeanbon Saint-André "to take again the island or to swallow it in the sea".

On 2 November 1793, the council of war of the army of the West charged Brigadier General Nicolas Haxo with forming a corps of 5,000 to 6,000 men to retake the island of Noirmoutier. He was ordered to attack and defeat Charette "wherever he might encounter him, pursuing him into Noirmoutier itself". Haxo planned his offensive and left Nantes on 21 and 22 November with two columns commanded by himself and his second-in-command, Adjutant-General Nicolas Louis Jordy. At the same time, another column commanded by General Dutruy and Lieutenant-Colonel Aubertin set off from Les Sables-d'Olonne. In the days that followed, Haxo and Jordy took Port-Saint-Père, Sainte-Pazanne, Bourgneuf-en-Retz, Machecoul and Legé, while Dutruy and Aubertin took La Roche-sur-Yon, Aizenay, Le Poiré-sur-Vie, Palluau and Challans. Defeated by Aubertin at La Garnache on 27 November, Charette tried to take refuge in Noirmoutier, but he found the Gois causeway impracticable because of the high tide and was forced to lock himself in the island of Bouin, where he was soon surrounded.

On 4 December, Charette embarked for the island of Noirmoutier. He entrusted his aide-de-camp, Joseph Hervouët de La Robrie, with the mission of going to England to request for help. La Robrie embarked on a 60 barrels schooner, Le Dauphin, commanded by Louis François Lefebvre. But because of unfavourable winds or the presence of republican ships, he can only set sail during the night of 23 to 24 December. (Note: Desmortiers also embarked on Le Dauphin. The outcome of the expedition is half-hearted. Le Dauphin reached Fishguard in Wales, where it was met with stones, then captured and set on fire. His passengers were imprisoned for several weeks. Joseph de La Robrie eventually obtained permission to travel to London, however, but he was not taken seriously by the British government because of his young age – 24 years old – and was not recognized as a diplomatic agent. On 25 January 1794, William Windham, the Secretary of War, recommended the government only give a few deck boats; and French emigrants with 17 pilots who have come from Noirmoutier, shall drive them with what we shall have loaded on them. On 23 February 1794-, La Robrie's companions were released and he received a letter stating only that: For the moment, we cannot discuss in a precise manner what to do until a port is in the hands of the Vendean leaders. The Vincent de Tinténiac emissary was then sent to the Vendée with dispatches signed by the Count d'Artois, the King of Great Britain George III, and the British minister Henry Dundas. He met Charette on 2 June 1794, establishing a first contact between the latter and the British. As for La Robrie, after an unsuccessful attempt in June 1794, he could not return to France until February 1795, but he drowned in the Bay of Bourgneuf)

On 5 December, Charette returned to Bouin. On the 6th, the columns of Jordy and Aubertin launched the assault on the island. In a few hours, the Republicans broke through the Vendean defences and freed several hundred patriot prisoners, but Charette only just escaped annihilation by fleeing through the marshes with some of his men.

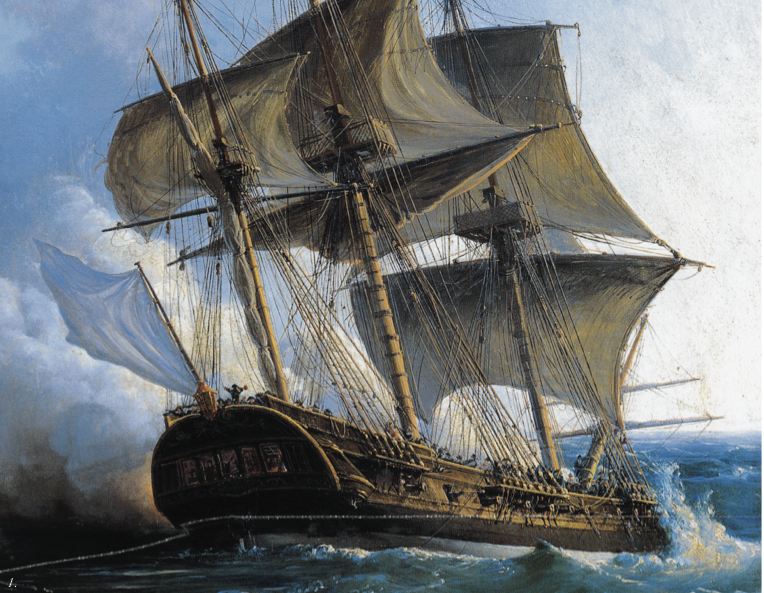
The frigate La Nymphe. Detail of the battle between the French frigates La Nymphe and L'Amphitrite against the English ship L'Argo (11 February 1783), oil on canvas by Pierre-Julien Gilbert, 1837, Musée de l'Histoire de France, Versailles.

He then joined the forces of Jean-Baptiste Joly and Jean Savin, with whom he unsuccessfully attacked the town of Legé on 8 December, but crushed the garrison of the camp of L'Oie on the 11th. On 12 December, at Les Herbiers, Charette was elected general-in-chief of the "Catholic and Royal Army of Bas-Poitou". He then decided to go to Anjou and Haut-Poitou to revive the insurrection there. In a few days, he crossed Le Boupère, Pouzauges, Cerizay and Châtillon, then reached Maulévrier.

Meanwhile, the Vendean forces engaged in the Galerne's campaign approached the Loire with the intention of regaining the Vendée. On 3 and 4 December, they attacked Angers, without success. On the 16th, a thousand Vendeansled by Generalissimo Henri de la Rochejaquelein, the successor of Maurice d'Elbée, used boats to cross the river at Ancenis, but the arrival of Republican gunboats prevented the rest of the army from crossing. These events forced Haxo to suspend the attack on Noirmoutier and to loosen the stranglehold on Charette. He sent reinforcements against La Rochejaquelein and was only able to send 2,400 men in pursuit of Charette under the command of Adjutant-General Dufour.

However, Charette's expedition was unsuccessful because with the return of Henri de la Rochejaquelein, the insurgent regions of Anjou and Haut-Poitou came back under his authority. After meeting La Rochejaquelein at Maulévrier on 22 December, Charette turned back and returned to Les Herbiers.

=== Prelude ===
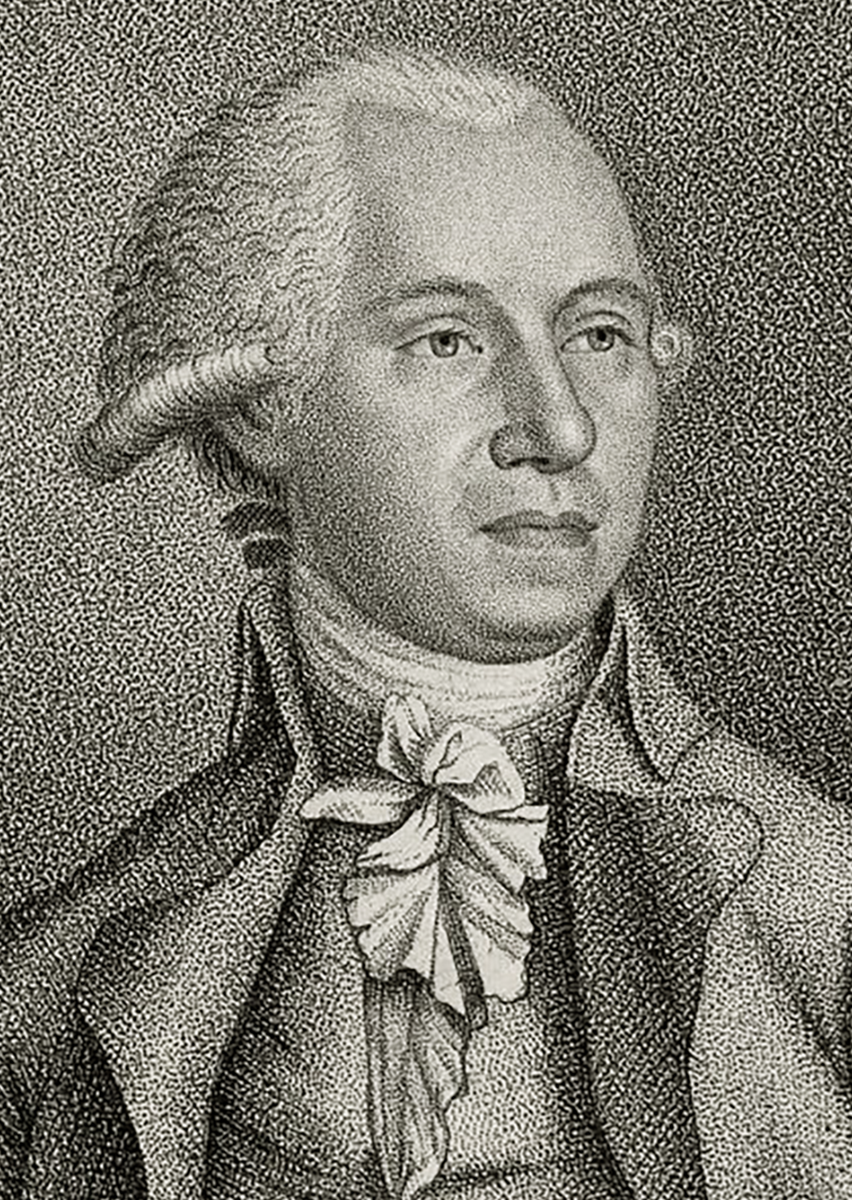
Pierre-Louis Prieur, known as Prieur de la Marne, engraving by Jean-Baptiste Vérité, 1790.

On 29 December 1793, General Louis Marie Turreau arrived in Nantes to take command of the Army of the West. Six days earlier, the Vendée army north of the Loire had been destroyed at the battle of Savenay. Turreau then gave the order to Haxo to launch the attack against the island of Noirmoutier.

From the end of December, exchanges of fire opposed the Republican ships and the Vendean coastal batteries. On 29 December, three frigates were hit. On 30 December, a cannonade took place on the Bois de la Chaize side. LaNymphe, a 26-gun frigate commanded by Lieutenant Pitot, the corvette Le Fabius and the gunboat L'Île-Dieu engaged in combat in the early afternoon, but it turned out badly for the Republicans. The Vendeans fired red balls, and one of them hit the mizzen mast of the Fabius. La Nymphe, with on board the representatives on a mission Prieur de la Marne, Turreau and Guermeur, received seven balls and ran aground after three hours of cannonade. The yard of grand hunier was cleanly broken, and the crew counted two dead and two to five wounded. (Note: After its grounding, La Nymphe sinks and remains abandoned for several years before being sold to a carpenter who takes the elements of the rigging"Noirmoutier. "La Nymphe" has rested here for 223 years". Ouest-France. 24 February 2017..) As for the hull, it remains submerged. The remains of the wreck were discovered in the Bay of Bourgneuf in 2014.

On 31 December, the movements of the barges between Bouin and Barbâtre alerted the besieged who expected an imminent attack. Throughout the end of December, the Vendeans fortified the various artillery batteries scattered around the island. Hyacinthe Hervouët de La Robrie and Dubois de La Guignardière developed a system of lights to warn the town of Noirmoutier in case of an attack. The stones and the beacons of the Gois causeway were destroyed. A messenger was also sent to Charette to ask for help. (Note: Desmortiers and Lucas de La Championnière give no information on this. For René Bittard des Portes and Julien Rousseau, a message from d'Elbée is carried by a Bretonne named Marie Lourdais. According to the former, she joined Charette in Touvois and for the latter, in Vieillevigne. For Françoise Kermina, Marie Lourdais was the messenger who informed Charette of the fall of the island. While according to Desmortiers, this news is brought by an officer of the marshes of Soullans who delivers a certainly apocryphal account according to Lionel Dumarcet. According to Dumarcet, the only evocation of a messenger concerns the Cavalier de Massip.)

On 31 December, the troops of Adjutant-General Carpantier left Machecoul and moved on to Challans to secure General Haxo's rear during the attack on Noirmoutier. But the same day, Charette stormed Machecoul, where only 200 to 300 men had been left. Informed, Haxo proposed to delay the expedition but Turreau refused and gave the order to continue. On 2 January 1794, a thousand men commanded by Carpantier retook Machecoul and put Charette's troop to flight. The latter attempted a counter-attack the following day, but was repulsed and retreated to La Copechagnière.

== Opposing forces ==
=== Republican Army ===
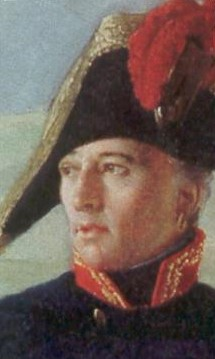
General Louis Marie Turreau, oil on canvas by Louis Hersent, 1800, Musée Carnavalet, Paris.

The Republicans mobilised 5,000 men for the operation, but only 3,000 to 3,200 took part in the fighting on the island. La Gazette de France of 22 Nivôse Year II (11 January 1794) gave the precise strength of 3,112 men, made up of 322 men from a battalion of volunteers from the Meurthe, 460 men from the 109th infantry regiment, 400 men from the 11th battalion of the Orleans formation, 200 men from a detachment from the Bec d'Ambès, 68 men from a detachment from the Charente, 46 men from a detachment from Ille-et-Vilaine, 60 men from a detachment of the 77th infantry regiment, 420 men from the 57th infantry regiment, 146 men from the Grenadiers réunis, 201 men from a battalion of grenadiers from the Ardèche, 100 men from a battalion from the Marne, 153 riflemen from the Loire-Inférieure, the Deux-Sèvres, Challans, Beaulieu and Apremont, 386 men from the 39th infantry regiment and 150 men from the 3rd battalion of volunteers from Lot-et-Garonne.

Adjutant-General Jordy, at the head of 1,500 men transported by 19 barges, led the first wave of the assault. In his "Précis historique", he indicated that his troop was made up of the 3rd Battalion of Vosges Volunteers, the 10th Battalion of Meurthe Volunteers, the 38th, the 57th and a detachment of the 109th Infantry Regiment, as well as a company of foot artillery, which had no guns with it but had to use those that would be taken at Noirmoutier. General Haxo, with 700 to 900 men, and nine gabares, was at the head of the second assault wave at the port of La Cronière, in Beauvoir-sur-Mer. A third force, made up of seven barges, was to move to the north of the island to create a diversion. A column was also in reserve under the orders of Lieutenant-Colonel Aubertin. In his memoirs, Aubertin states that his column was made up of 455 men from the 11th battalion of the Orléans formation, detachments from the 109th and 110th infantry regiments, as well as some other corps, Mayençais grenadiers and artillerymen from the 1st battalion of Bas-Rhin volunteers.

The operations were supervised by Turreau, commander-in-chief of the army of the West, who had arrived in Beauvoir-sur-Mer on 1 January, and by three representatives on a mission: Prieur de la Marne, who was also a member of the Committee of Public Safety, Louis Turreau, the cousin of the general in chief, and Pierre Bourbotte.

=== Vendean Army ===
The Vendean garrison left by Charette to defend the island of Noirmoutier was 1,500 men strong according to the royalists Lucas de La Championnière and Le Bouvier-Desmortiers, 1,800 for Turreau and 2,000 according to the anonymous memoirs of the military administrator. These numbers are variously taken up by historians: Jean-Joël Brégeon and Gérard Guicheteau give 1,500, Yves Gras and Jean Tabeur 1,800, Émile Gabory and Lionel Dumarcet 2,000. This garrison was under the orders of Alexandre Pineau du Pavillon. René de Tinguy was governor of the island, Benjamin Dubois de La Guignardière, former captain of Soullans' national guard, was commander of the main town, Louis Vasselot de Reigner was commander of the castle and Bernard Massip was second in command of the garrison. Hyacinthe Hervouët de La Robrie commanded 500 men in Barbâtre. Other leaders included Louis Savin, Jean Jodet, Pierre Gouin, Gazette de La Limousinière, Joseph Béthuis, Loizeau, Barraud père and fils de La Garnache and the parish captains Barraud de Saint-Hilaire-de-Riez and Barraud du Perrier.

Maurice d'Elbée, former generalissimo of the Catholic and Royal Army, is also present in Noirmoutier after having taken refuge there on the 2 or 3 November because of his serious wounds received at the battle of Cholet. He was accompanied by his wife, Marguerite-Charlotte Duhoux d'Hauterive; his brother-in-law, Pierre Duhoux d'Hauterive; and his friend Pierre Prosper Gouffier de Boisy. The place of his asylum is not well known. According to his grand-nephew, Charles-Maurice d'Elbée, and the Marquise de Bonchamps, he was lodged in the Jacobsen Hotel, then in the house of Madame Mourain. According to François Piet, he lived in a house called La Maduère.

== Course of events ==
=== Sources ===
The course of events is known from various Republican sources. Adjutant-General Jordy sent a report to the Minister of War, and then wrote a more detailed account in his "Précis historique de mes actions civiles et militaires, par Jordy". The events are also evoked in Turreau's memoirs, Adjutant-General Aubertin and in the anonymous memoirs of a "military administrator". Testimonies are also left by two republican soldiers: André Amblard, a volunteer from Mayence, who wrote a logbook, and Auguste Dalicel, a brigadier in the 3rd battalion of volunteers from Lot-et-Garonne, who reported the fighting in a letter to his uncle. They both took part in the landings, under Jordy's orders. The most detailed account is given by Captain François Piet, then aged 19, born in Montmédy, aide-de-camp to General Dutruy. who wrote his "Memoirs left to my son" in 1806 During the battle, he fought in General Haxo's column. Appointed as a war commissioner in Noirmoutier in 1795, he then settled on the island where he worked as a notary during the Empire and the Restoration, before becoming a justice of the peace during the July Monarchy. His memoirs were published by his son, Jules Piet, in 1863.

=== Disembarkation at Pointe de la Fosse ===
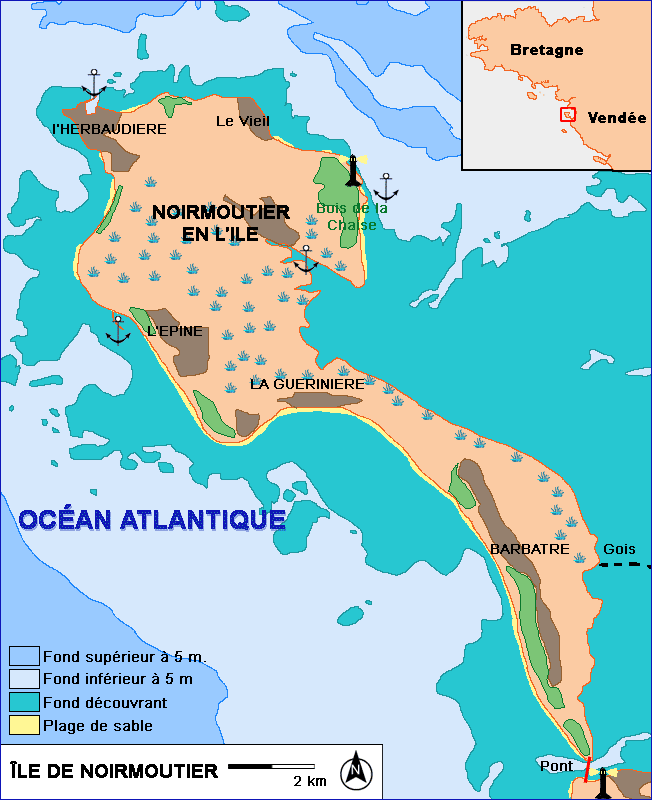
Map of the island of Noirmoutier.

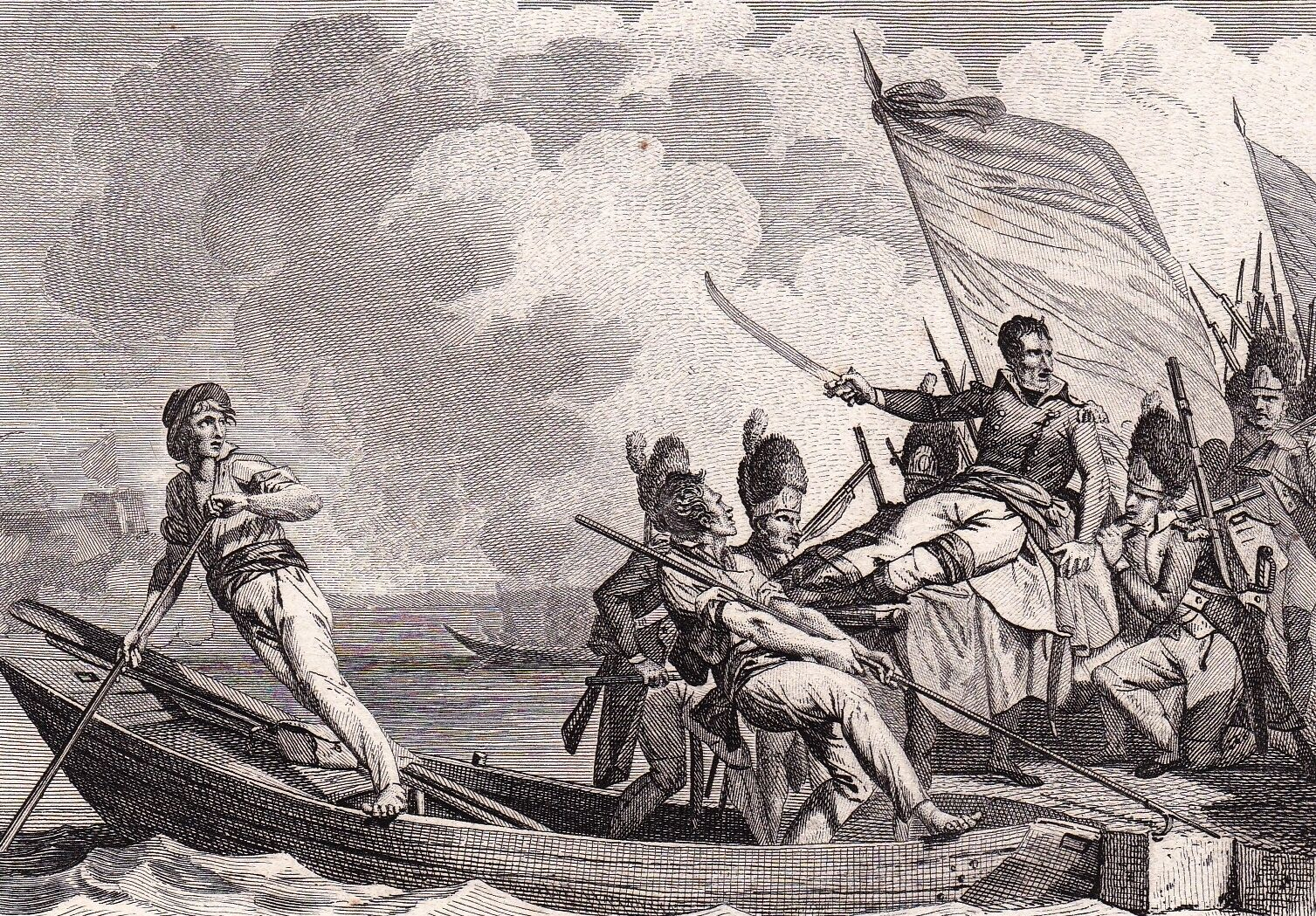
Nicolas Louis Jordy at the Battle of Noirmoutier, anonymous engraving, 1825.

On 2 January, Jordy had his soldiers embark on the barges at La Barre-de-Monts and L'Époids, between Bouin and Beauvoir-sur-Mer. (Note: In the evening, at ten o'clock, we embarked on barges within gun range of the island. They didn't notice it until they started firing at us. Our gunboats responded with great enthusiasm without being able to dismantle any of their batteries. It was a superb sight to see this rolling fire, but it is that, while taking pleasure in seeing it, we felt its effect. Our gabarre, which was called Marie-Thérèse, a name that brings bad luck, was hit by two twenty-four ball shells; one went right through it, broke three rifles, the kidneys and the shoulder of a grenadier, and took away the head of the one who touched me; I had my face all smeared with his brains.: Letter from Auguste Dalicel.) At midnight, the flotilla set sail. The place chosen for the landing was between the Pointe de la Fosse, at the southern end of the island, and the Gois causeway.

While a small number of the barges sailed towards La Chaise and the port of Noirmoutier to create a diversion, Jordy headed for La Fosse. Despite the darkness, the Vendeans saw the Republican ships and at around 5 or 6 o'clock in the morning the eleven cannons of the artillery battery at La Fosse opened fire. About half a league north of the tip of the point, Jordy placed his barges in line, facing the shore: those in the centre responded to the fire of the Vendeans in order to attract their attention, while those on the wings began to unload the troops. A rocket gave the signal. As the republicans had no boats, the tide was low and the sea shallow, the infantrymen threw themselves directly into the water. In order to avoid fratricidal fire, they were ordered to fight only with the bayonet. Several barges ran aground on the beach during the operation. Jordy was wounded in the thigh and leg before he could leave his ship. He reached the shore, carried by grenadiers who made an improvised stretcher with their rifles. However, his manoeuvre succeeded and the Vendéens retreated so as not to find themselves surrounded. At 7 o'clock in the morning, all his troops had disembarked. The Fosse battery was taken in reverse and the Republican artillerymen seized the cannons. In his letter, Brigadier Dalicel wrote: "We were in firing range until eight o'clock. When we set foot on the ground, our people fell like cardboard capuchins. Once we were five or six hundred on the island, we made carnage of everything. On the side where we made the descent, we filled a salt marsh with the dead; there may well have been 900 of them, more of ours than of theirs.

=== Fighting at Barbâtre ===
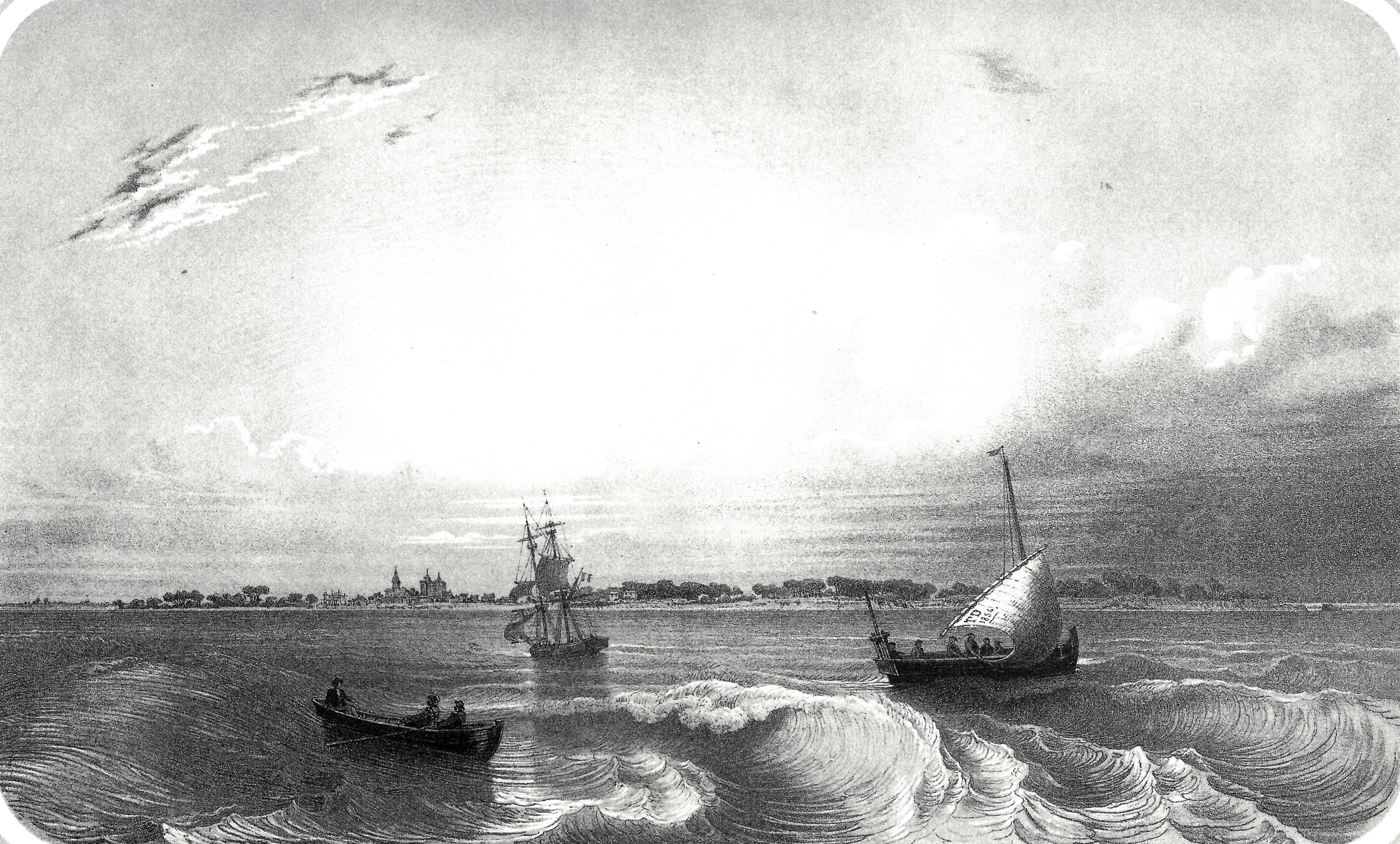
View of Noirmoutier, engraving by Thomas Drake, ca. 1850.

The republicans then marched on the village of Barbâtre, held by the forces of Hyacinthe de La Robrie with a battery of four 36-pounder guns, and took it after a one-hour battle. All the men who were found in Barbâtre were massacred. According to the memoirs of François Piet: "peaceful people, fathers of families, old men who had stayed in their houses, millers who had not wanted to leave their mills, became the victims of the soldier's fury". (Note: The village of Barbâtre was surrounded. He was well punished for his treason: all the men there were killed.: Logbook of André Amblard; The resentment aroused by the wounds received by Jordy and some of the republicans of his division was not the only motive that led our troops to take revenge; unfortunately they were made to remember the part that the inhabitants of Barbâtre had taken in the cause of the Vendeans; they showed no mercy towards them. Those who, not having to reproach themselves for having supported the royalists, had believed that they could present themselves in front of our army, peaceful people, fathers of families, old people who had remained in their houses, millers who had not wanted to leave their mills, became the victims of the soldier's fury. It was in vain that these unfortunate people protested, in front of him, of their attachment to the Republic, that they held out their hands in supplication, that they kissed his knees, asking for mercy; insensitive to their pain, he seemed, on the contrary, to triumph over it; without wanting to distinguish the innocent from the guilty, and as if he had entered a city taken by storm, he indiscriminately put to death all the men he found.: Memoirs of François Piet.)

On his side, General Haxo began to cross the Gois causeway at about 9 o'clock in the morning, followed by the column of Aubertin. In spite of the low tide, the soldiers are up to their knees in water and the crossing is carried out slowly. Around noon or one o'clock in the afternoon, Haxo arrived at Barbâtre, where he joined up with Jordy, whose troops were at rest. Shortly before giving up his command, Jordy was seriously wounded by a Biscayan, who pierced his left parietal bone.

=== Capitulation of the Vendeans ===
After joining forces with Jordy, Haxo, now at the head of 3,000 men, marched on the town of Noirmoutier, in the north of the island. Near La Guérinière, on the narrowest part of the island, he encountered an entrenchment equipped with artillery. However, the Republicans took advantage of the low tide to bypass it on the right and left, and the Vendeans retreated without firing a single cannon shot. Haxo's troops then advanced to the outskirts of the town without encountering any resistance.

At three o'clock in the afternoon, two or three Vendéen horsemen presented themselves at the bridge of the Corbe, to hand over an offer of capitulation in exchange for the life of the whole garrison. General Haxo welcomed the offer, but the representatives on mission, Prieur de la Marne, Turreau and Bourbotte, expressed their opposition. However, on the insistence of Haxo, the representatives let it go. (Note: The republican column arriving by the charraud was at a short distance from the great bridge, when royalist officers presented themselves in front of it, declared that the garrison submitted to the Republic and promised not to serve against it any longer, if they wanted to give it their lives. They refused to listen to any proposal until the white flag still flying on the dungeon had been brought in. It was at this moment that the commissioners of the Convention manifested their sanguinary dispositions. We must not and do not want to deal with brigands," they said. Let them all be put to the sword! These terrible words were their death warrant and that of all the inhabitants of the island, confused with them. They froze the blood of the refugees who heard them. [...] It was all over, everything was perishing, if General Haxo had not opposed this terrible carnage. His high stature, his white hair, the pride of his attitudes, the flame of his eyes, his intrepid courage and his humanity, made him dear to the army. Revolted by this excess of injustice and barbarism: "Representatives," he said, "we are soldiers and not executioners. We do not know how to massacre our enemy when he is unarmed, much less islanders, most of whom are Republicans like us. I ask you, in the name of the army, that the lives of the inhabitants be respected, and that it be granted also to the Royalists, if they lay down their arms." At the same time, the tricolor flag was seen replacing the white flag, and the Royalists renewed their proposals. But the representatives, little moved by the words of the generous Haxo, without precisely contradicting him, made an evasive reply, and which must have made their execrable ulterior motive only too obvious. Without any further foresight, the governor added to the faults he had already committed, by agreeing to the conditions of an unwritten capitulation. In vain will one object that, as false as they were cruel, the representatives would not have violated a treaty with their signatures, it is at least permissible to doubt it. The staff of the republican army and most of the officers who composed it still had enough honor and humanity to resist their bloody orders if they had wanted to break the faith of a formal capitulation. It was verbally agreed that the garrison would immediately put down their weapons, arrange them in bundles in the main square, and that the officers and soldiers would all go to the church, where they would be made prisoners. These conditions were punctually executed, and when we entered the city, the streets were deserted. – Memoirs of François Piet A league from the city, some parliamentarians came to present themselves to General Haxo. Moderate, loyal, generous as he was, he would have made good with them. But three members of the Convention were with him; it was to this authority, superior to his own, that he had to send the parliamentarians. One can guess the reception they received from the representatives of the people; they were sent back with terrible threats. The troops, officers and soldiers, secretly murmured at this inhumanity. – Memoirs of Adjudant-General Aubertin. We marched on the city. The rebels, seeing themselves surrounded, asked to capitulate. The representative of the people did not want to surrender to the rebels. He wanted them to be driven in by force. General Haxo observed to him that by doing so he would lose many of his brave soldiers, that he preferred to adhere to the capitulation. They surrendered at their discretion, formed bundles of their weapons in the square. The men, numbering about three thousand, were shut up in the churches. – Logbook of André Amblard At this aspect, terror seized the inhabitants of the city of Saint-Pierre; the combatants themselves believed that a considerable landing had taken place. [...] They sent two members of parliament to ask that they be granted their lives and freedom, promising on this condition to lay down their arms. The frank and loyal manner in which Haxo was accustomed to waging war had encouraged them to attempt this step; but as he had beside him overseers who forced him to be circumspect, he sent the parliamentarians back to the commissioners of the Convention, who, far from welcoming them, dismissed them with these despairing words: "Go and tell those who have sent you, that no pardon is given to brigands, and that we want to cement the republic with their blood." This answer caused consternation among the inhabitants and the royalists; however, they did not lose all hope: they believed that if their first words of peace had not been well received, it was because their deputies had not made enough efforts with general Haxo. They resolved consequently to send him two others who found him at half a league from the city. [...] The general felt that the slightest resistance could keep him in check for a long time, and perhaps make him miss the goal of his expedition; he judged it appropriate to receive the two new parliamentarians favorably. Jealous, however, not to fail in the rules of propriety, he consulted the representatives of the people on what he should answer; but when he saw that they rejected any idea of clemency, he said to them, with that dignity and that tone of authority which reason and humanity give: " Citizens representants, I am clothed with the confidence of the government; I command Frenchmen against misguided Frenchmen, and since I can spare the blood of both, I declare to you that I promise the lives of the royalists who will surrender. " This determination imposed on the commissioners of the Convention, who were not accustomed to meeting men energetic enough to give them lessons in honor and virtue. They seemed to leave the general free to promise whatever he wanted; but they reserved for themselves "in petto" the right of perfidy. Haxo turned to the parliamentarians, and said to them: "You may return to the city, urge your constituents to go to the parade ground and lay down their rifles, sabers, etc., in bundles; assure them that they will be given the justice that is due them." This equivocal assurance has since given the impression that he had penetrated the intentions of the representatives. However, the royalists put their full trust in him, and received their last deputies with demonstrations of the most lively elation. – Anonymous memoirs of the military administrator They dared to accuse my colleagues who braved the bombs and the cannons for the salvation of the Republic, who constantly laid down on the hard, who shared all the fatigues of the soldier, they dared to say that they had made massacre patriots. Here is the truth. The rebels of Noirmoutier, unable to defend themselves, came to ask for mercy, and not to propose a treaty, as has been said. Bourbotte and [Louis] Turreau answer: "No pardon for the conspirators! (There is applause.) The general of the Republic advances his columns, and all the rebels are exterminated. To slaughter the patriots? How could this have been done? There was not a single one in Noirmoutier! – Declarations of Jean-Baptiste Carrier to the National Convention, 9 March 1794, Le Moniteur)

Governor Tinguy, a conciliator, seemed to believe in keeping his word. If some leaders, such as Hyacinthe de La Robrie and Benjamin Dubois de La Guignardière, were of the opinion that they should fight to the end, the vast majority of the defenders preferred to surrender. The republicans enter the town without encountering any resistance. (Note: One may wonder, how, among the leaders of this troop, there was not a leader capable of a heroic resolution. The island offered numerous means of defense to oppose the Republicans. [...] A resistance of twenty-four hours would have forced the 3000 men of General Haxo to withdraw, because there was no means of sustenance for them on the island. – Memoirs of Adjutant-General Aubertin.) The Vendeans gather in the square and throw their rifles in heaps

The generalissimo Maurice d'Elbée is quickly discovered and taken prisoner. Dubois de La Guignardière is wounded and captured. According to Piet, his hiding place is denounced by Foré, a republican gunner to whom he had saved his life during the capture of the island by Charette. Only one leader, Hyacinthe de La Robrie, barely managed to escape and leave the island after having remained hidden for several days in the marshes of l'Épine.

== Losses ==
On the evening of 3 January, the representatives on mission, Prieur de la Marne, Turreau and Bourbotte, stated in a letter to the National Convention that the expedition had only cost the Republic two men killed and ten to twelve wounded, including "the brave Jordy". In his report to the Minister of War, General Turreau also only mentions the loss of "ten men, most of whom are only wounded". and in his memoirs "ten or twelve men and some wounded" Jordy, on the other hand, puts Republican losses at 130 killed and 200 wounded in his report to the Minister of War. Jordy himself was seriously wounded and had to undergo trepanning. The day after the battle, he was promoted to the rank of brigadier general, while Aubertin was raised to the rank of adjutant-general.

On the side of the Vendéens, the number of combatants killed in battle is put at 400 by General Turreau, 500 by the representatives Prieur de la Marne, Turreau and Bourbotte, as well as by the "military administrator" and 600 by the representative Guermeur. The number of prisoners was 600 according to François Piet, 600 to 700 initially and 1,200 in total, according to Adjutant-General Aubertin, 1,000 according to General Turreau, 1,100 according to Dalicel 1,000 to 1,200 according to the representative Guermeur, 1,200 according to representatives Prieur, Turreau and Bourbotte 1,500 according to the "military administrator", 2,000 according to the Revolutionary Committee of the "île de la Montagne" and 3,000 according to the volunteer Amblard. However, Turreau and Bourbotte announced on 8 January that 300 more "brigands" had been taken after battues and searches in the woods and underground passages. For the historian Alain Gérard, the estimates of 1,100 to 1,200 prisoners seem the most likely. In 1975, in his dissertation for his DES in legal history, Les Commissions de Noirmoutier. Janvier 1794 à août 1794, Jean-Louis Pellet recommended a range of 1,200 to 1,500 prisoners shot.

The republicans also took 19 cannons and 11 pierriers according to General Turreau. Prieur, Turreau and Bourbotte reported the capture of around 50 cannons and 700 to 800 rifles, Guermeur 52 cannons and 800 rifles and Jordy 80 pieces of large artillery and 23 medium and small ones.

== Execution of prisoners ==
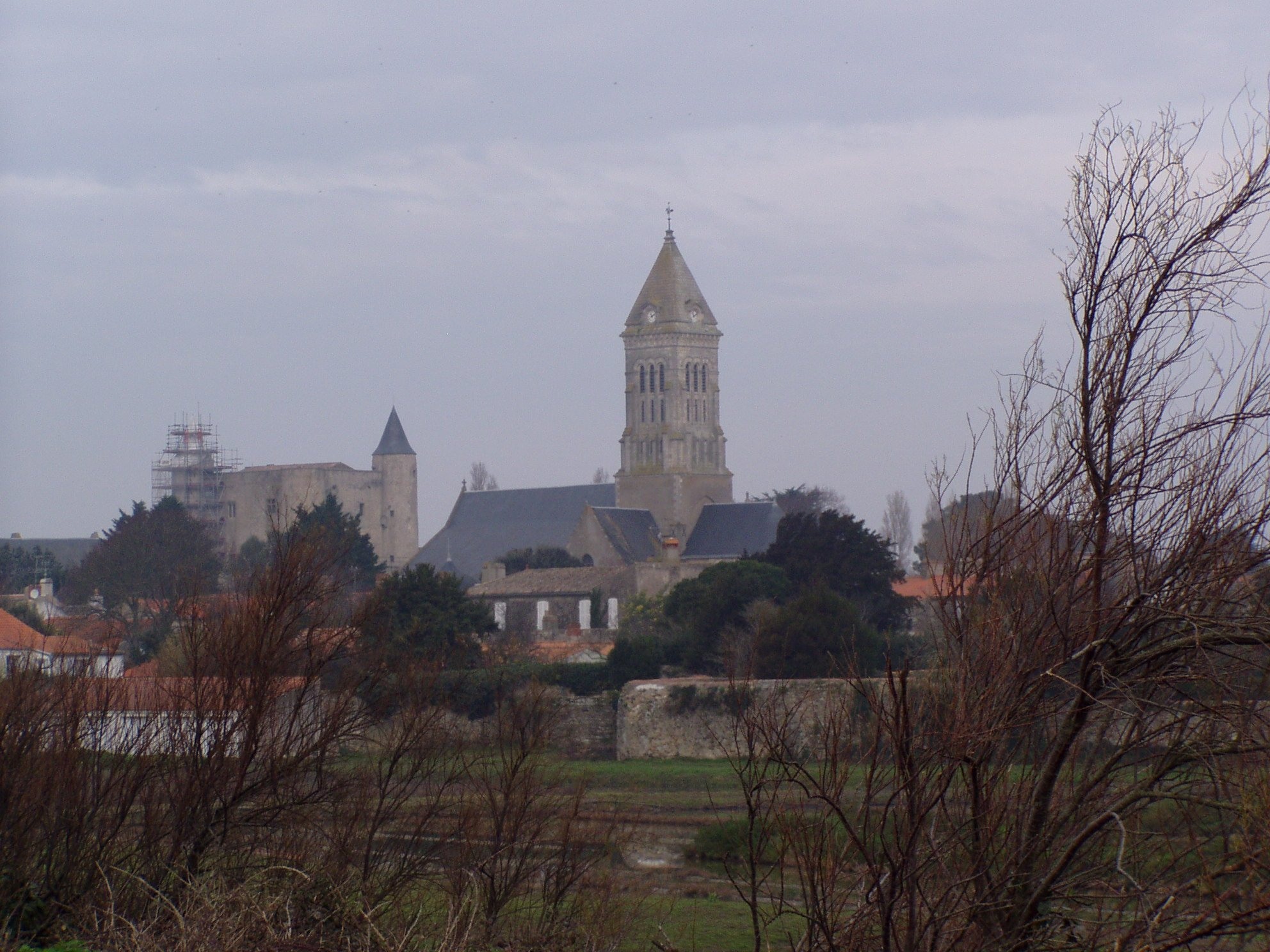
View in 2007 of the place of the Banzeau executions, as well as the castle and the church of Saint-Philbert de Noirmoutier.

The prisoners are locked up in the churches of the city. The capitulation is not respected by the representatives in mission who decide to make pass all the garrison by the weapons in spite of a vain attempt of Haxo to oppose it. (Note: The very next day, the representatives no longer concealed the odious mental restriction they had placed on the sort of capitulation granted to the garrison. It was not enough for them to spill blood in Barbâtre, they needed torrents of it to satisfy this atrocious policy which wanted to reign by terror. The defeated, by submitting, could not escape death. In vain Haxo still wanted to plead their cause, in vain he observed that the life of the men who surrender at discretion must be as sacred as that of the unhappy ones that the storm threw on the shore: his efforts were useless. He was told that it was necessary to comply with the decrees of the Convention, to give a great example to the enemies of the Republic, and all the prisoners were condemned to death. The leaders only appeared and disappeared before a military commission charged with collecting their names and surnames, and obtaining from them some declarations relative to the later projects of their party. – Memoirs ofFrançois Piet) The evening of the capture of the island, they write to the Committee of Public Safety: "a military commission, which we have just created, will make prompt justice of all these traitors". The executions began on 4 January, and were carried out for the most part in two or three days. Only 70 men from Notre-Dame-de-Monts managed to convince the commission that they had been forcibly enlisted and were spared. The prisoners were taken in groups from the church of Saint-Philbert and taken to the place known as "la Vache", in the district of Banzeau, where they were shot at close range. The street used by the condemned prisoners would be named "Rue des Martyrs" many years later.

François Piet writes in his memoirs:

Within two days, all the non-commissioned officers and soldiers succumbed in turn to the deadly lead. Sixty of them were taken out of the church at a time, and arranged in rosaries, they were led to the district of Banzeau, on the seashore. There, pushed forward and often wounded before receiving the mortal blow, they made useless efforts to avoid it. They appeared through the smoke of the musketry like bloody shadows. They fell on the mud, where they were stripped and buried to some depth. The Republicans for some time kept this part of the city the name of the quartier de la Vengeance

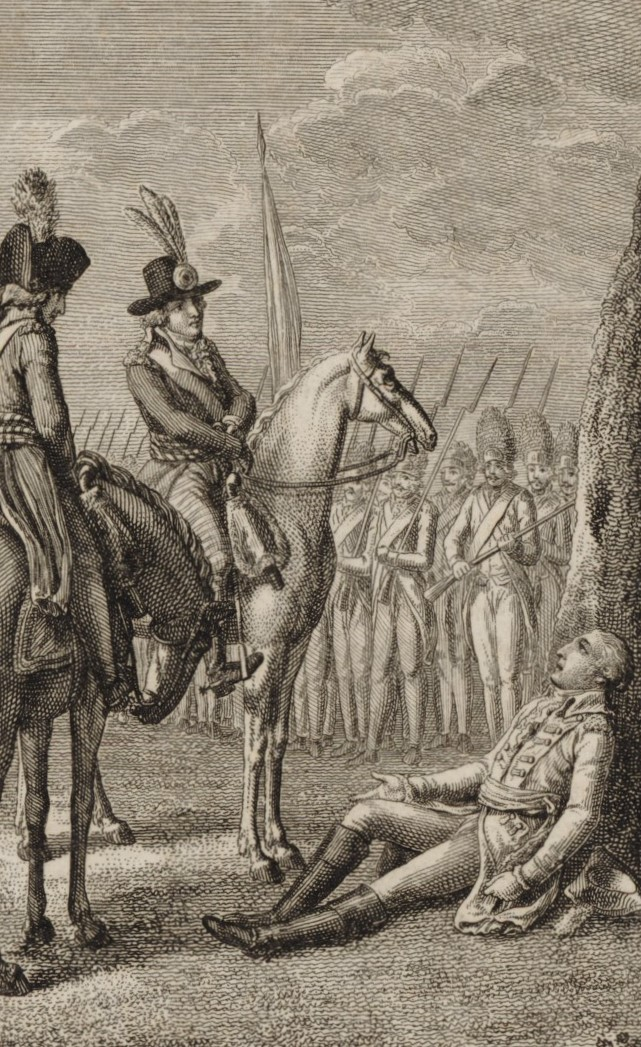
Delber's Generals der Vendeer, helden müthiger Tod, 1794–1799, Bibliothèque nationale de France. Anonymous German print depicting the death of the Vendéen general Maurice d'Elbée.

On 4 January, the republican troops start to search the island and according to Turreau and Bourbotte "a flood of priests, women of emigrants" and many leaders are arrested. On 8, the representatives in mission announce to the Committee of Public Safety the creation of a military commission to judge these prisoners. This one sits at the Jacobsen hotel. The instruction is very summary, the judges being satisfied to record the identity of the captives and to obtain from them various information. Tinguy, Pineau du Pavillon, Dubois, Savin, Reigner and the various Vendéen chiefs were shot at a date that is impossible to determine. Eight clergymen were also among the victims, including René-Charles Lusson, vicar of Saint-Georges-de-Montaigu and chaplain to the army of the Centre.

The republicans also discovered in Noirmoutier Lieutenant-Colonel Jean-Conrad Wieland, who commanded the republican garrison when Charette took the island. He was soon accused of treason, especially as a letter he had written to Commandant Pineau du Pavillon indicated that he had maintained good relations with the royalist staff during the occupation of the island by the Vendeans. The representatives on mission then decided to have Wieland executed, without trial according to Piet's memoirs.

Maurice d'Elbée was interrogated by the representatives on mission and by General Turreau at an uncertain date. The minutes of his interrogation were written by François Piet. The former generalissimo was executed between 6 and 9 January. Unable to walk, he was carried in an armchair to the Place d'Armes, accompanied by Pierre Duhoux d'Hauterive and Pierre Prosper Gouffier de Boisy. Jean-Conrad Wieland was added to them despite the denials of his co-accused who tried in vain to clear him. The four men were then tied to posts. and shot

A few more executions took place in the following weeks. On 29 January, d'Elbée's wife, Marguerite-Charlotte Duhoux d'Hauterive, and Victoire Élisabeth Mourain de L'Herbaudière, née Jacobsen, were shot after being sentenced to death by the military commission.

Most of the bodies are buried in the dunes of La Claire and near Le Vieil and La Madeleine. Others, like that of d'Elbée, were thrown into the moat of the castle. From 5 January to 25 April, up to 25 gravediggers, led by the citizen Honoré Aubert, who had become "responsible for the health of the air", were employed to "recover the corpses".

In 1950, on the initiative of Abbé Raimond, a chapel called Notre-Dame de la Pitié, or "Chapelle des Martyrs", was built on the site of the Banzeau shootings.

== Destructions at Barbâtre ==
The same evening of the capture of the island, the representatives Prieur de la Marne, Turreau and Bourbotte decide to rename Noirmoutier to "île de la Montagne". The island of Bouin becomes the "Marat island". On 8 January, they declared the inhabitants of Barbâtre "traitors to the Fatherland" and ordered the destruction of all the houses in the town, except those "suitable for public establishments and the defence of the coast". According to Piet, the order of destruction was only carried out "as regards the church and the houses bordering the plain on the eastern side". In total, 87 houses were destroyed and 200 to 300 inhabitants of Barbâtre emigrated to Noirmoutier-en-l'Île. The population of Barbâtre fell from 2,221 inhabitants in 1791 to 1,421 in 1804.

== The prison of Noirmoutier ==
After the fighting and massacres of January, Noirmoutier experienced a period of calm. According to the memoirs of François Piet: "A few months passed without anything disturbing the peace we enjoyed. [...] A large garrison left us without worrying about new ventures on the part of the Vendéens. [...] Country parties, music, balls, were a diversion from past misfortunes, and a stunner for future ones".

However, the island was then used as a prison, where male and female Vendéen prisoners arrested on the continent were sent. A new military commission was then established in Noirmoutier due to the dissolution of the commissions in Sables-d'Olonne and Fontenay-le-Comte. It was made up of Collinet, president, Simon, Foré and Tyroco, judges, and François Piet, accuser. From 5 May to 14 June 1794, it pronounced at least 28 death sentences and a large number of acquittals. The condemned were shot on the dunes between Le Vieil and La Claire and buried on the spot. However, according to Piet, about fifty prisoners sent by the Revolutionary Committee of Les Sables, as soon as they disembarked at La Chaise, were shot without trial on Tyroco's orders. Following a decree by representatives Bourbotte and Bô, the Collinet commission was replaced by members of the Angers commission – made up of Antoine Félix, president; Laporte, vice-president; Obrumier and Goupil, judges; and Hudoux, accuser – which pronounced 25 death sentences, 18 deportations and 600 acquittals between 17 June and 14 August 1794. The last executions on the island took place on 3 August at La Claire: 22 people, including 13 women, were shot. In total, at least 1,300 people were imprisoned in Noirmoutier during 1794 and between 128 and 400 died there.

== Consequences ==
On the evening of 3 January 1794, just before embarking for Nantes, Turreau wrote from Noirmoutier to the minister of war Jean-Baptiste Bouchotte: "The war of the Vendée is not completely finished, but it should not give any more concern". On their side, the representatives in mission Prieur de la Marne, Turreau and Bourbotte write the same day to the Committee of Public Safety: "The victory is with us. The resumption of the important port of Noirmoutier, which was the last entrenchment and the last hope of the rebels of the Vendée, gives us the insurance to see soon completely finished this infamous war; it removes to the brigands any communication by sea with the perfidious English; it makes the Republic mistress of a country fertile in subsistence".

The Vendée insurrection then seemed to have expired. In the Bas-Poitou, the column of Adjutant-General Dominique Joba crushed the 3,000 men of Charette and Joly at Saint-Fulgent on 10 January, then dislodged them the next day from the forest of Grasla. Wounded, Charette spent the rest of January hiding with several hundred men in the convent of Val de Morière, then in Saligny and in the forest of Grasla. In Pays de Retz, General Haxo routed La Cathelinière's forces on 12 January, who had taken refuge in the Princé forest. Wounded, La Cathelinière is captured in February and executed in March. In Anjou, the few hundred men gathered by Henri de la Rochejaquelein and Jean-Nicolas Stofflet are dispersed on 1 January at Les Cerqueux by the troops of General Grignon.

Repression intensified in the Vendée in early 1794. On 11 December 1793, the representative on a mission, Jean-Baptiste Carrier, had written to the Committee of Public Safety: "As soon as the news of the capture of Noirmoutier reaches me, I will send an imperative order to Generals Dutruy and Haxo to put to death in all the insurgent countries all the individuals of all sexes who are found there, without distinction, and to complete the burning of everything". In Nantes, Turreau planned a general offensive aimed at destroying the last royalist bands and setting fire to the entire insurgent territory. In mid-January, he had his "infernal columns" set in motion.

== Notes and references ==
=== Notes ===
1. Desmortiers also embarked on Le Dauphin. The outcome of the expedition is half-hearted. Le Dauphin reached Fishguard in Wales, where it was met with stones, then captured and set on fire. His passengers were imprisoned for several weeks. Joseph de La Robrie eventually obtained permission to travel to London, however, but he was not taken seriously by the British government because of his young age – 24 years old – and was not recognized as a diplomatic agent. On 25 January 1794, William Windham, the Secretary of War, recommended the government only
  give a few deck boats; and French emigrants with 17 pilots who have come from Noirmoutier, shall drive them with what we shall have loaded on them.
  On 23 February 1794-, La Robrie's companions were released and he received a letter stating only that:
  For the moment, we cannot discuss in a precise manner what to do until a port is in the hands of the Vendean leaders. The Vincent de Tinténiac emissary was then sent to the Vendée with dispatches signed by the Count d'Artois, the King of Great Britain George III, and the British minister Henry Dundas. He met Charette on 2 June 1794, establishing a first contact between the latter and the British. As for La Robrie, after an unsuccessful attempt in June 1794, he could not return to France until February 1795, but he drowned in the Bay of Bourgneuf
2. After its grounding, La Nymphe sinks and remains abandoned for several years before being sold to a carpenter who takes the elements of the rigging"Noirmoutier. "La Nymphe" has rested here for 223 years". Ouest-France. 24 February 2017..
3. Desmortiers and Lucas de La Championnière give no information on this. For René Bittard des Portes and Julien Rousseau, a message from d'Elbée is carried by a Bretonne named Marie Lourdais. According to the former, she joined Charette in Touvois and for the latter, in Vieillevigne. For Françoise Kermina, Marie Lourdais was the messenger who informed Charette of the fall of the island. While according to Desmortiers, this news is brought by an officer of the marshes of Soullans who delivers a certainly apocryphal account according to Lionel Dumarcet. According to Dumarcet, the only evocation of a messenger concerns the Cavalier de Massip.
4. In the evening, at ten o'clock, we embarked on barges within gun range of the island. They didn't notice it until they started firing at us. Our gunboats responded with great enthusiasm without being able to dismantle any of their batteries. It was a superb sight to see this rolling fire, but it is that, while taking pleasure in seeing it, we felt its effect. Our gabarre, which was called Marie-Thérèse, a name that brings bad luck, was hit by two twenty-four ball shells; one went right through it, broke three rifles, the kidneys and the shoulder of a grenadier, and took away the head of the one who touched me; I had my face all smeared with his brains.
  - Letter from Auguste Dalicel.
5. The village of Barbâtre was surrounded. He was well punished for his treason: all the men there were killed.
  - Logbook of André Amblard
  The resentment aroused by the wounds received by Jordy and some of the republicans of his division was not the only motive that led our troops to take revenge; unfortunately they were made to remember the part that the inhabitants of Barbâtre had taken in the cause of the Vendeans; they showed no mercy towards them. Those who, not having to reproach themselves for having supported the royalists, had believed that they could present themselves in front of our army, peaceful people, fathers of families, old people who had remained in their houses, millers who had not wanted to leave their mills, became the victims of the soldier's fury. It was in vain that these unfortunate people protested, in front of him, of their attachment to the Republic, that they held out their hands in supplication, that they kissed his knees, asking for mercy; insensitive to their pain, he seemed, on the contrary, to triumph over it; without wanting to distinguish the innocent from the guilty, and as if he had entered a city taken by storm, he indiscriminately put to death all the men he found.
  - Memoirs of François Piet.
6. The republican column arriving by the charraud was at a short distance from the great bridge, when royalist officers presented themselves in front of it, declared that the garrison submitted to the Republic and promised not to serve against it any longer, if they wanted to give it their lives. They refused to listen to any proposal until the white flag still flying on the dungeon had been brought in. It was at this moment that the commissioners of the Convention manifested their sanguinary dispositions. We must not and do not want to deal with brigands," they said. Let them all be put to the sword! These terrible words were their death warrant and that of all the inhabitants of the island, confused with them. They froze the blood of the refugees who heard them. [...] It was all over, everything was perishing, if General Haxo had not opposed this terrible carnage. His high stature, his white hair, the pride of his attitudes, the flame of his eyes, his intrepid courage and his humanity, made him dear to the army. Revolted by this excess of injustice and barbarism: "Representatives," he said, "we are soldiers and not executioners. We do not know how to massacre our enemy when he is unarmed, much less islanders, most of whom are Republicans like us. I ask you, in the name of the army, that the lives of the inhabitants be respected, and that it be granted also to the Royalists, if they lay down their arms." At the same time, the tricolor flag was seen replacing the white flag, and the Royalists renewed their proposals. But the representatives, little moved by the words of the generous Haxo, without precisely contradicting him, made an evasive reply, and which must have made their execrable ulterior motive only too obvious. Without any further foresight, the governor added to the faults he had already committed, by agreeing to the conditions of an unwritten capitulation. In vain will one object that, as false as they were cruel, the representatives would not have violated a treaty with their signatures, it is at least permissible to doubt it. The staff of the republican army and most of the officers who composed it still had enough honor and humanity to resist their bloody orders if they had wanted to break the faith of a formal capitulation. It was verbally agreed that the garrison would immediately put down their weapons, arrange them in bundles in the main square, and that the officers and soldiers would all go to the church, where they would be made prisoners. These conditions were punctually executed, and when we entered the city, the streets were deserted.
  – Memoirs of François Piet
  A league from the city, some parliamentarians came to present themselves to General Haxo. Moderate, loyal, generous as he was, he would have made good with them. But three members of the Convention were with him; it was to this authority, superior to his own, that he had to send the parliamentarians. One can guess the reception they received from the representatives of the people; they were sent back with terrible threats. The troops, officers and soldiers, secretly murmured at this inhumanity.
  – Memoirs of Adjudant-General Aubertin.
  We marched on the city. The rebels, seeing themselves surrounded, asked to capitulate. The representative of the people did not want to surrender to the rebels. He wanted them to be driven in by force. General Haxo observed to him that by doing so he would lose many of his brave soldiers, that he preferred to adhere to the capitulation. They surrendered at their discretion, formed bundles of their weapons in the square. The men, numbering about three thousand, were shut up in the churches.
  – Logbook of André Amblard
  At this aspect, terror seized the inhabitants of the city of Saint-Pierre; the combatants themselves believed that a considerable landing had taken place. [...] They sent two members of parliament to ask that they be granted their lives and freedom, promising on this condition to lay down their arms. The frank and loyal manner in which Haxo was accustomed to waging war had encouraged them to attempt this step; but as he had beside him overseers who forced him to be circumspect, he sent the parliamentarians back to the commissioners of the Convention, who, far from welcoming them, dismissed them with these despairing words: "Go and tell those who have sent you, that no pardon is given to brigands, and that we want to cement the republic with their blood." This answer caused consternation among the inhabitants and the royalists; however, they did not lose all hope: they believed that if their first words of peace had not been well received, it was because their deputies had not made enough efforts with general Haxo. They resolved consequently to send him two others who found him at half a league from the city. [...] The general felt that the slightest resistance could keep him in check for a long time, and perhaps make him miss the goal of his expedition; he judged it appropriate to receive the two new parliamentarians favorably. Jealous, however, not to fail in the rules of propriety, he consulted the representatives of the people on what he should answer; but when he saw that they rejected any idea of clemency, he said to them, with that dignity and that tone of authority which reason and humanity give: " Citizens representants, I am clothed with the confidence of the government; I command Frenchmen against misguided Frenchmen, and since I can spare the blood of both, I declare to you that I promise the lives of the royalists who will surrender. " This determination imposed on the commissioners of the Convention, who were not accustomed to meeting men energetic enough to give them lessons in honor and virtue. They seemed to leave the general free to promise whatever he wanted; but they reserved for themselves "in petto" the right of perfidy. Haxo turned to the parliamentarians, and said to them: "You may return to the city, urge your constituents to go to the parade ground and lay down their rifles, sabers, etc., in bundles; assure them that they will be given the justice that is due them." This equivocal assurance has since given the impression that he had penetrated the intentions of the representatives. However, the royalists put their full trust in him, and received their last deputies with demonstrations of the most lively elation.
  – Anonymous memoirs of the military administrator
  They dared to accuse my colleagues who braved the bombs and the cannons for the salvation of the Republic, who constantly laid down on the hard, who shared all the fatigues of the soldier, they dared to say that they had made massacre patriots. Here is the truth. The rebels of Noirmoutier, unable to defend themselves, came to ask for mercy, and not to propose a treaty, as has been said. Bourbotte and [Louis] Turreau answer: "No pardon for the conspirators! (There is applause.) The general of the Republic advances his columns, and all the rebels are exterminated. To slaughter the patriots? How could this have been done? There was not a single one in Noirmoutier!
  – Declarations of Jean-Baptiste Carrier to the National Convention, 9 March 1794, Le Moniteur
7. One may wonder, how, among the leaders of this troop, there was not a leader capable of a heroic resolution. The island offered numerous means of defense to oppose the Republicans. [...] A resistance of twenty-four hours would have forced the 3000 men of General Haxo to withdraw, because there was no means of sustenance for them on the island.
  – Memoirs of Adjutant-General Aubertin.
8. The very next day, the representatives no longer concealed the odious mental restriction they had placed on the sort of capitulation granted to the garrison. It was not enough for them to spill blood in Barbâtre, they needed torrents of it to satisfy this atrocious policy which wanted to reign by terror. The defeated, by submitting, could not escape death. In vain Haxo still wanted to plead their cause, in vain he observed that the life of the men who surrender at discretion must be as sacred as that of the unhappy ones that the storm threw on the shore: his efforts were useless. He was told that it was necessary to comply with the decrees of the Convention, to give a great example to the enemies of the Republic, and all the prisoners were condemned to death. The leaders only appeared and disappeared before a military commission charged with collecting their names and surnames, and obtaining from them some declarations relative to the later projects of their party.
  – Memoirs ofFrançois Piet

== Bibliography ==
- Mémoires sur la Vendée comprenant les mémoires inédits d'un ancien administrateur militaire des armées républicaines, et ceux de Madame de Sapinaud (in French). Baudoin frères, Libraires. 1823.
- Aubertin, Dominique (1824). Mémoires sur la guerre de la Vendée, en 1793 et 1794, par l'adjudant-général Aubertin (in French). Paris: Baudoin frères, libraires-éditeurs.
- Baguenier Desormeaux, Henri (1893). Documents sur Noirmoutier et sur la mort de d'Elbée et de ses compagnons (in French). Paris: Imprimerie Lafolye.
- Berriat-Saint-Prix, Charles (1870). La justice révolutionnaire août 1792 (in French). Vol. III. Paris: Michel Lévy frères, éditeurs.
- Brégeon, Jean-Joël; Guicheteau, Gérard (2017). Nouvelle histoire des guerres de Vendée (in French). Paris: Perrin. ISBN 978-2-262-04417-6.
- Chantreau, Alain (2010). Deux attaques de Legé par les armées républicaines (in French). Histoire militaire des guerres de Vendée (Economica ed.). Paris: Hervé Coutau-Bégarie and Charles Doré-Graslin (dir.).
- Chassin, Charles-Louis (1892). La préparation de la guerre de Vendée 1789–1793 (in French). Vol. III. Histoire militaire des guerres de Vendée. Paris: Hervé Coutau-Bégarie and Charles Doré-Graslin (dir.).
- Chassin, Charles-Louis (1894). La Vendée Patriote 1793–1795 (in French). Vol. III. Paris: Paul Dupont, éditeur.
- Doré Graslin, Philbert (1979). Itinéraires de la Vendée militaire (in French). Paris: Garnier Frères.
- Dumarcet, Lionel (1998). François Athanase Charette de La Contrie, Une histoire véritable (in French). Paris: Les 3 Orangers.
- Gabory, Émile (2009). Les Guerres de Vendée (in French). Éditions Robert Laffont. ISBN 978-2-221-11309-7.
- Gérard, Alain (2013). Vendée (in French) (Centre vendéen de recherches historiques ed.). La Roche-sur-Yon: Éditions Robert Laffont. ISBN 978-2-221-11309-7.
- Guillet, Rémi (2015). Noirmoutier, Une île qui séduit ! (in French). Angoulême: Éditions Robert Laffont. ISBN 979-10-90226-39-5.
- Hussenet, Jacques (2007). " Détruisez la Vendée ! " Regards croisés sur les victimes et destructions de la guerre de Vendée (in French). La Roche-sur-Yon: Centre vendéen de recherches historiques. ISBN 978-2911253348.
- Gras, Yves (1994). La guerre de Vendée : 1793-1796 (in French). La Roche-sur-Yon: Economica. ISBN 978-2-7178-2600-5.
- Le Bouvier-Desmortiers, Urbain-René-Thomas (1809). Réfutation des calomnies publiées contre le général Charette (in French). Vol. I.
- Loidreau, Simone; et al. (Hervé Coutau-Bégarie and Charles Doré-Graslin (dir.)) (2010). Charette l'insaisissable – 6 décembre 1793 (in French). Histoire militaire des guerres de Vendée. Economica.
- Lucas de la Championnière, Pierre-Suzanne (1994). Lucas de La Championnière, Mémoires d'un officier vendéen 1793–1796 (in French). Les Éditions du Bocage.
- Savary, Jean Julien Michel (1825). Guerres des Vendéens et des Chouans contre la République française (in French). Baudoin frères, Libraires-éditeurs.
- Tabeur, Jean (2008). Paris contre la province : les guerres de l'ouest, 1793–1796 (in French). Economica. ISBN 978-2-7178-5641-5.
- Turreau, Louis-Marie (1824). Mémoires pour servir à l'histoire de la guerre de la Vendée, par le général Turreau (in French). Digitized 12 May 2014. Paris: Baudoin frères, libraires.

Preceded by First Battle of Noirmoutier	War in the Vendée; Second Battle of Noirmoutier; 1794	Succeeded by Republican victory
