= Louis Marie Turreau =

French Army officer (1756–1816)

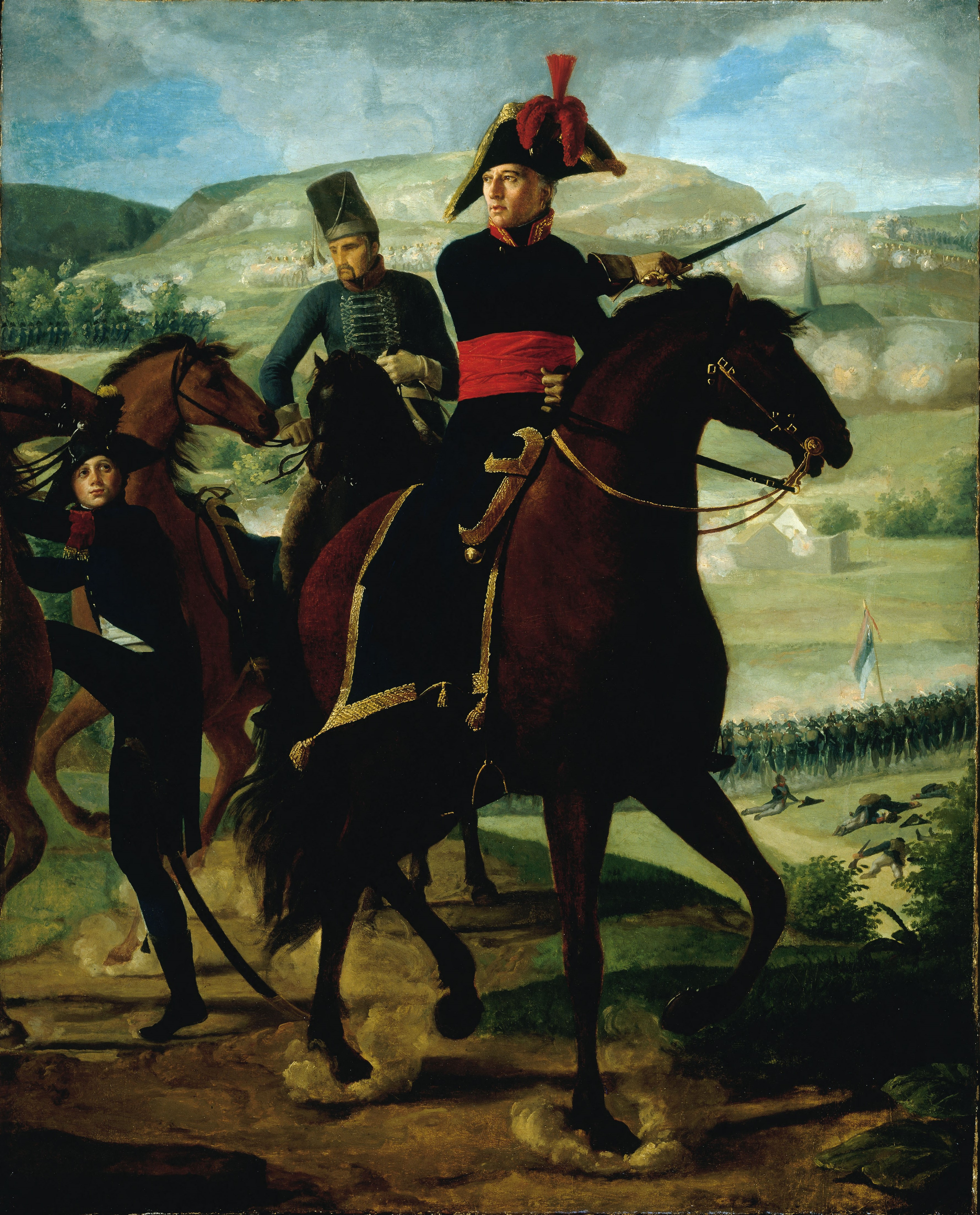
- Portrait by Louis Hersent, c. 1800
- Nicknames: Turreau de Garambouville; Turreau de Linières
- Born: 4 July 1756; Évreux, France
- Died: 10 December 1816 (aged 60) Conches, France
- Allegiance: Kingdom of France; French First Republic; First French Empire
- Branch: French Royal Army; French Revolutionary Army; French Imperial Army
- Service years: 1789–1814
- Rank: Divisional general
- Commands: Army of the Western Pyrenees; Army of the West
- Conflicts: French Revolutionary Wars; War in the Vendée; Battle of Noirmoutier (1794)
- Awards: Knight of Saint-Louis; Baron of the Empire
- Other work: Governor of Belle-Île; French ambassador to the United States

Divisional-General Louis Marie Turreau (French pronunciation: [lwi maʁi tyʁo]; 4 July 1756 – 10 December 1816) was a French Army officer and diplomat who served in the French Revolutionary Wars. He was most notable as the organiser of the infernal columns during the war in the Vendée, which massacred tens of thousands of Vendéens and ravaged the countryside. He attained army command, but without notable military accomplishments. Under the First French Empire, he pursued a career as a high functionary, serving as the French ambassador to the United States then a Baron of the Empire.

== Early life ==
Louis Marie Turreau's father was fiscal procurator for waters and forests to the comté d'Évreux, before becoming mayor of Évreux. This situation imparted certain privileges to the Turreau family, even though they were not nobles. Turreau was nevertheless a fervent revolutionary from 1789, profiting like many others, especially the bourgeois of that era. Elected mayor of Aviron, he bought several clerical estates (such as that of the Abbaye Saint-Pierre et Saint-Paul de Châtillon-lès-Conches.

== Career to 1794 ==
Before the Revolution, he had not had any real military activity, having entered the guards corps of the comte d’Artois but only been inscribed for supernumerary roles (he was only a reservist). On the Revolution, he entered the National Guard of Conches, and took over as its leader in July 1792. In September he was elected captain of a company of volunteers from Eure and set out to fight on the northern frontiers. Made a colonel in November, he was integrated into the Army of the Moselle.

In June 1793, Turreau was brought into the Army of the coasts of La Rochelle, remaining so until 8 October though the post did not please him. He wrote to a friend, "I would move heaven and earth not to go to Poitou. This kind of war displeases me." Even so, he fought for two months in the Vendée. He served as head of the Army of the Eastern Pyrenees from 12 October until 27 November 1793. During that period, he was defeated by Spanish General Antonio Ricardos at the Battle of the Tech (Pla-del-Rey) on 13–15 October. In January 1794, he denounced fellow general Eustache Charles d'Aoust to the Committee of Public Safety, leading to d'Aoust's execution in July. He became commander in chief of the Armée de l'Ouest from 29 December, but he again regarded this post with little enthusiasm. Before he arrived at his post, the last elements of the Armée catholique et royale were erased by Jean-Baptiste Kléber and François Séverin Marceau at the Battle of Savenay on 23 December.

== Infernal columns ==
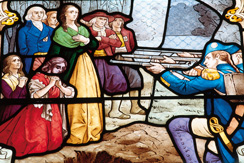
Stained glass depicting massacres by the infernal columns under Turreau

In the spring of 1794, the government with the approval of Lazare Carnot sent the Infernal columns, under the direction of General Turreau through the Vendée to suppress counter-revolutionary forces. It cost the lives of 1% of the French population.

=== Later career ===
On 20 May Turreau was named governor of Belle-Île, then arrested on 28 September 1794. He spent a year in prison, which he used to edit his Mémoires pour servir à l’histoire de la Vendée. He refused the amnesty of 4 Brumaire year IV which closed the works of the National Convention, aiming to be unequivocally rehabilitated. On 19 December 1795 he was acquitted by a military tribunal which judged he had only been obeying orders. Under the French Consulate he was sent as an envoy to Switzerland. In May and June 1800, he commanded a division in a diversionary attack on Turin from the west but missed the Battle of Marengo. From 1803 to 1811 he was French ambassador to the United States of America, then commander of several military strongholds.

In 1814, he submitted to Louis XVIII and during the Hundred Days published a Mémoire contre le retour éphémère des hommes à privilèges. On the Bourbon Restoration he was not prosecuted, either for libel or for the infernal columns. He was on the list of those awarded the cross of Saint-Louis, but died before being able to attend an official ceremony of the order to receive it.

== Distinctions ==
- Baron de Linières (1812)
- Chevalier de Saint-Louis (1814)
- His name is engraved on the 15th column of the Arc de Triomphe colonne (the Arch shows TURREAU).

== Sources ==
=== Books ===
- Arnold, James R. Marengo & Hohenlinden. Barnsley, South Yorkshire, UK: Pen & Sword, 2005. ISBN 1-84415-279-0

=== External links ===
- Louis Turreau Sa Defaite au Pla-del-Rey Un Secret Defense by Bernard Prats in French
- Banyuls-sur-Mer, l'Heritage du 25 Frimaire An II des Somatents by Bernard Prats in French
