= Sommesous =

- Commune
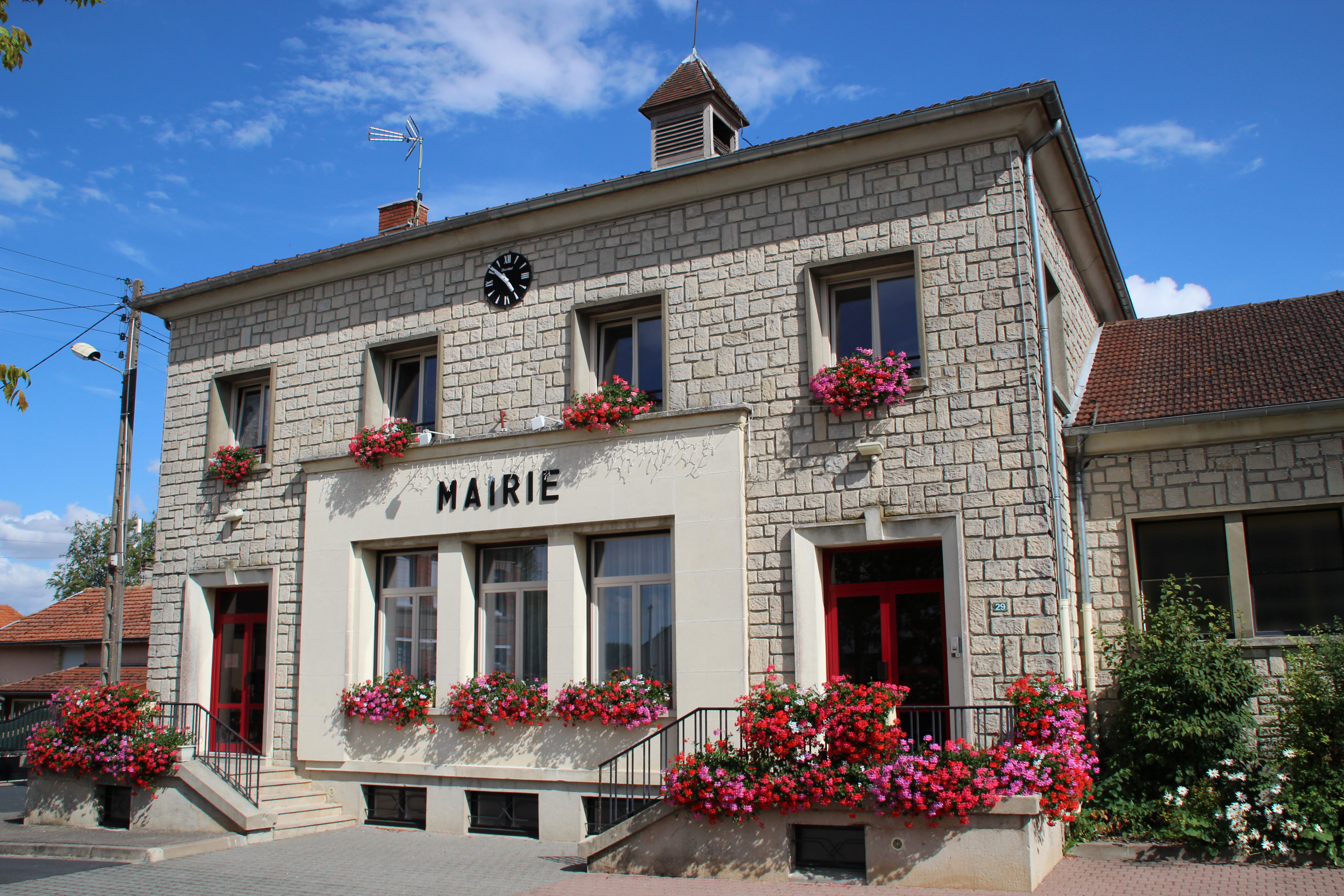
- The town hall in Sommesous
- Location of Sommesous
- Location within France Location within Grand Est
- Coordinates: 48°44′21″N 4°11′51″E
- Country: France
- Region: Grand Est
- Department: Marne
- Arrondissement: Châlons-en-Champagne
- Canton: Châlons-en-Champagne-3
- Intercommunality: CA Châlons-en-Champagne

Government
  - Mayor (2020–2026): Jean-Pierre Colpin
- Area^{1}: 37.04 km^{2} (14.30 sq mi)
- Elevation: 168 m (551 ft)
- Population (2023): 467
  - Density: 12.6/km^{2} (32.7/sq mi)
- Time zone: UTC+01:00 (CET)
  - Summer (DST): UTC+02:00 (CEST)
- INSEE/Postal code: 51545 /51320
- ^{1} French Land Register data, which excludes lakes, ponds, glaciers > 1 km^{2} (0.386 sq mi or 247 acres) and river estuaries.

Sommesous is a commune in the Marne department in north-eastern France.

It was the birthplace of Pierre Louis Prieur (1756–1827), French politician.

== See also ==
- Communes of the Marne department
