= Soullans =

- Commune
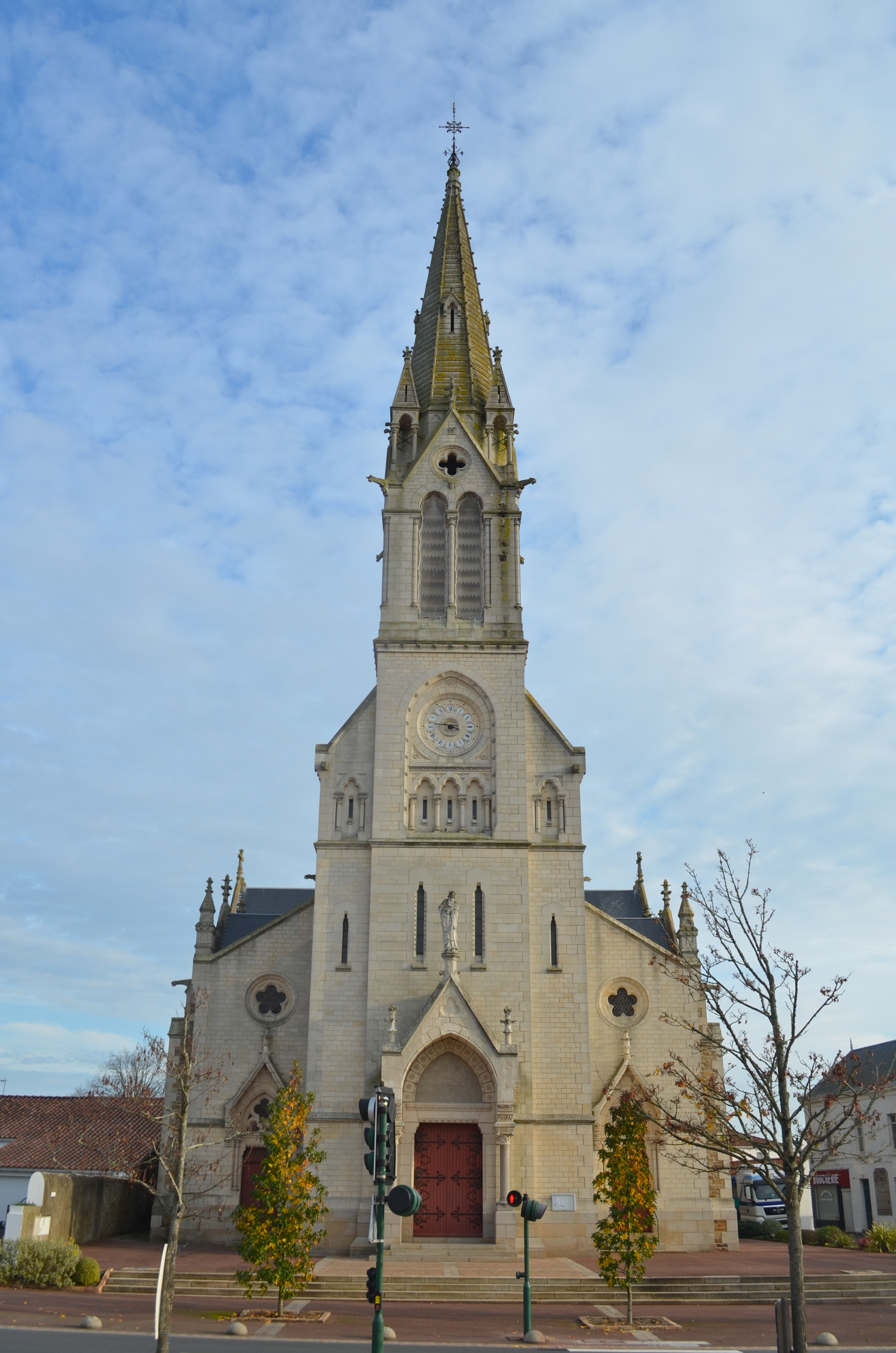
- The church in Soullans

- Coat of arms
- Location of Soullans
- Location within France Location within Pays de la Loire
- Coordinates: 46°47′48″N 1°53′55″W
- Country: France
- Region: Pays de la Loire
- Department: Vendée
- Arrondissement: Les Sables-d'Olonne
- Canton: Saint-Jean-de-Monts

Government
  - Mayor (2020–2026): Jean-Michel Rouillé
- Area^{1}: 41.09 km^{2} (15.86 sq mi)
- Highest elevation: 23 m (75 ft)
- Lowest elevation: 0 m (0 ft)
- Population (2023): 4,654
  - Density: 113.3/km^{2} (293.4/sq mi)
- Time zone: UTC+01:00 (CET)
  - Summer (DST): UTC+02:00 (CEST)
- INSEE/Postal code: 85284 /85300
- ^{1} French Land Register data, which excludes lakes, ponds, glaciers > 1 km^{2} (0.386 sq mi or 247 acres) and river estuaries.

Soullans (French pronunciation: [sulɑ̃]) is a commune in the Vendée department in the Pays de la Loire region in western France.

== Population ==
Historical population
Year	Pop.	±% p.a.
1968	1,945	—
1975	2,272	+2.24%
1982	2,629	+2.11%
1990	3,045	+1.85%
1999	3,425	+1.32%
2007	3,912	+1.68%
2012	4,149	+1.18%
2017	4,221	+0.34%
2023	4,654	+1.64%
Source: INSEE

== See also ==
- Communes of the Vendée department
