= Pierre Louis Prieur =

Member of the Committee of Public Safety

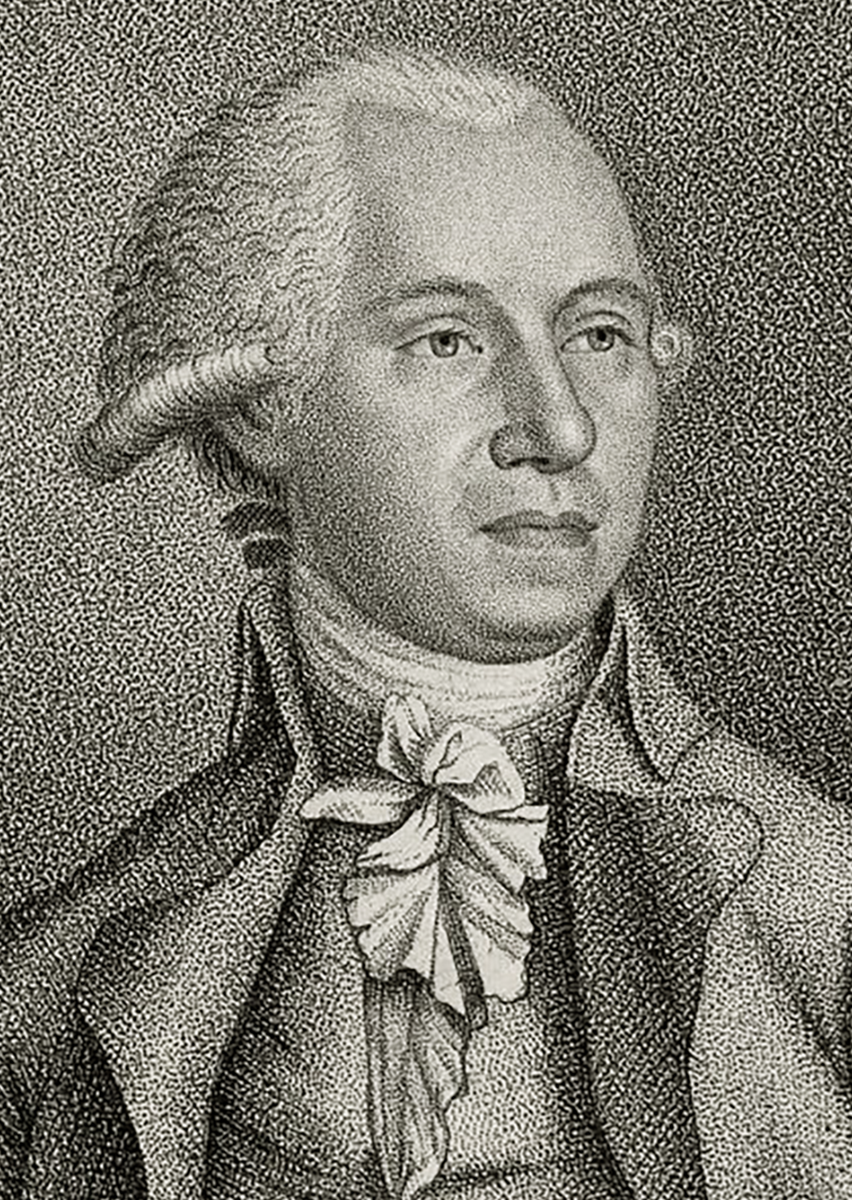
- Pierre Louis Prieur

53rd President of the National Convention
- In office 22 October – 6 November 1794
- Preceded by: Jean-Jacques-Régis de Cambacérès
- Succeeded by: Louis Legendre

Personal details
- Born: 1 August 1756 Sommesous, Marne, Kingdom of France
- Died: 31 May 1827 (aged 70) Brussels
- Political party: The Mountain
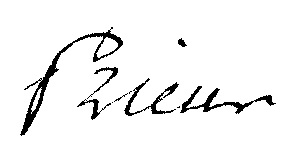
- Signature

Pierre Louis Prieur (Prieur de la Marne) (1 August 1756 – 31 May 1827) was a French lawyer elected to the Estates-General of 1789. During the French Revolution he served as a deputy to the National Convention and held membership in the Committee of Public Safety.

== Biography ==
Born in Sommesous (Marne), Prieur practised as a lawyer at Châlons-sur-Marne until 1789, when he was elected to the States-General. He became secretary to the National Constituent Assembly, and the violence of his attacks on the ancien régime won him the pun nickname of Crieur de la Marne ("Shouter of the Marne").

In 1791, he became vice-president of the criminal tribunal of Paris. Re-elected to the Convention, he was sent to Normandy, where he directed bitter reprisals against the supporters of Federalism.

He voted for the death of King Louis XVI, and as a member of the Committees of National Defence and of Public Safety he was despatched in October 1793 to Brittany, where he established the local version of the Reign of Terror. In May 1794 he became president of the Convention. The Thermidorian Reaction drove him into hiding from May 1795 until the amnesty proclaimed in the autumn of that year.

He took no part in public affairs under the Directory, the Consulate or the Empire, and in 1816, after the Bourbon Restoration, he was banished as a regicide.

Prieur died in Brussels in 1827.
