= Falleron (river) =

French coastal river

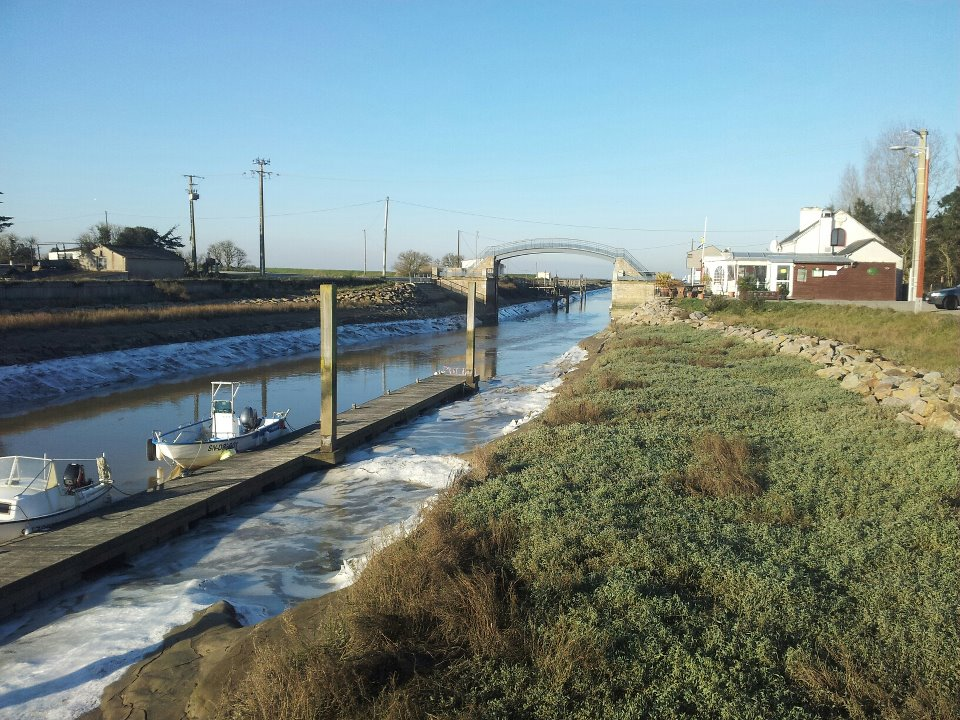
- Mouth of the Falleron at the port of Collet
- Native name: Falleron (French)

Location
- Country: France
- Departments: Loire-Atlantique, Vendée

Physical characteristics
- Source
  - location: Grand'Landes
  - coordinates: 46°51′18″N 01°39′04″W
  - elevation: 60 m (200 ft)
- Mouth
  - location: Bay of Bourgneuf at Port du Collet
  - coordinates: 47°01′45″N 1°59′0″W
- Length: 52 km (32 mi)
- Basin size: 419 km^{2} (162 sq mi)

The Falleron (French pronunciation: [falʁɔ̃]) is a French coastal river forming the boundary between the departments of Vendée and Loire-Atlantique and flowing into the Bay of Biscay and Atlantic Ocean via the Bay of Bourgneuf.

== Geography ==
The Falleron is 52 km long, from its source at an altitude of 60 metres (200 ft), in the town of Grand'Landes in the Vendée department flowing west to its mouth in the Bay of Bourgneuf at the Port du Collet.

== Hydrography ==
The main tributaries of the Falleron upstream of Machecoul, from upstream to downstream are la Gautrelière (5 km (3.1 mi)), whose confluence on the right bank lies to the east of the eponymous town of Falleron and which marks the start of the boundary between Loire-Atlantique on the right bank and Vendée on the left. To the west of Falleron town le Marchais (7 km (4.3 mi)) joins on the left bank. At Saint-Etienne-de-Mer-Morte the ruisseau de la Blanchardière (9 km (5.6 mi) joins on the left bank and defines a further section of the departmental boundary.

At Machecoul, the 3.3 kilometres (2.1 mi) long Canal d’Amenée ("Supply canal") or Canal d'Irrigation ("Irrigation canal"), constructed before the end of the 18th century, links the right bank of the Falleron with the left bank of the Tenu and, via series of pumps and sluices, helps maintain the water levels in the Marais Breton during dry periods. The gradient of the Tenu is so slight that fresh water can be diverted from the Loire at high tide this far upstream. A pumping station at La Pommeraie, built in 1962, raises water the remaining 3 metres (9.8 ft) from the Tenu to the Falleron. The canal increasingly serves to drain Machecoul during periods of intense rainfall.

Downstream of Machecoul the Falleron opens into the marshes and polders of the Marais Breton, and divides and connects with a complex network of freshwater and semi-tidal creeks and canals. On the right bank l'étier de la Gravelle (7 km (4.3 mi)) and l'étier de la salle (13 km (8.1 mi)) form the core of a section to the north. The main channel of the Falleron divides, the southern branch (l'étier du Chiron Boileau) being joined to l'étier de la Taillé Gouine. The channels reunite at Port de la Roche and are re-joined by the étier de la Salle on the right bank. Further downstream the Dain canal joins on the left bank and flows 15 km (9.3 mi) south-west around the former isle and town of Bouin reaching the Bay of Bourgneuf at L'Epoids. The Falleron itself flows northwest from the confluence of the Dain canal, joined on the right bank by l’étier de fresne and l’étier de la charreau blanche which, with its tributary, l’étier du gros baron, drain the areas around Bourgneuf-en-Retz and Les Moutiers-en-Retz. The Falleron flows into the Bay of Bourgneuf at the Port du Collet.

== Communes crossed ==
The Falleron crosses or constitutes the limit of the following municipalities:

- Grand'Landes (Vendée);
- Falleron (Vendée) and Touvois (Loire-Atlantique);
- Froidfond, La Garnache (Vendée) and Saint-Étienne-de-Mer-Morte (Loire-Atlantique);
- Paulx (Loire-Atlantique);
- Machecoul (Loire-Atlantique);
- Bois-de-Céné (Vendée) and Bourgneuf-en-Retz (Loire-Atlantique);
- Bouin (Vendée) and Les Moutiers-en-Retz (Loire-Atlantique).

== See also ==
Media related to Falleron (river) at Wikimedia Commons
