= Battle of Bois-de-Céné =

Battle of the War in the Vendée (1793)

Coordinates: 46.939°N 1.8842°W

- Part of War in the Vendée
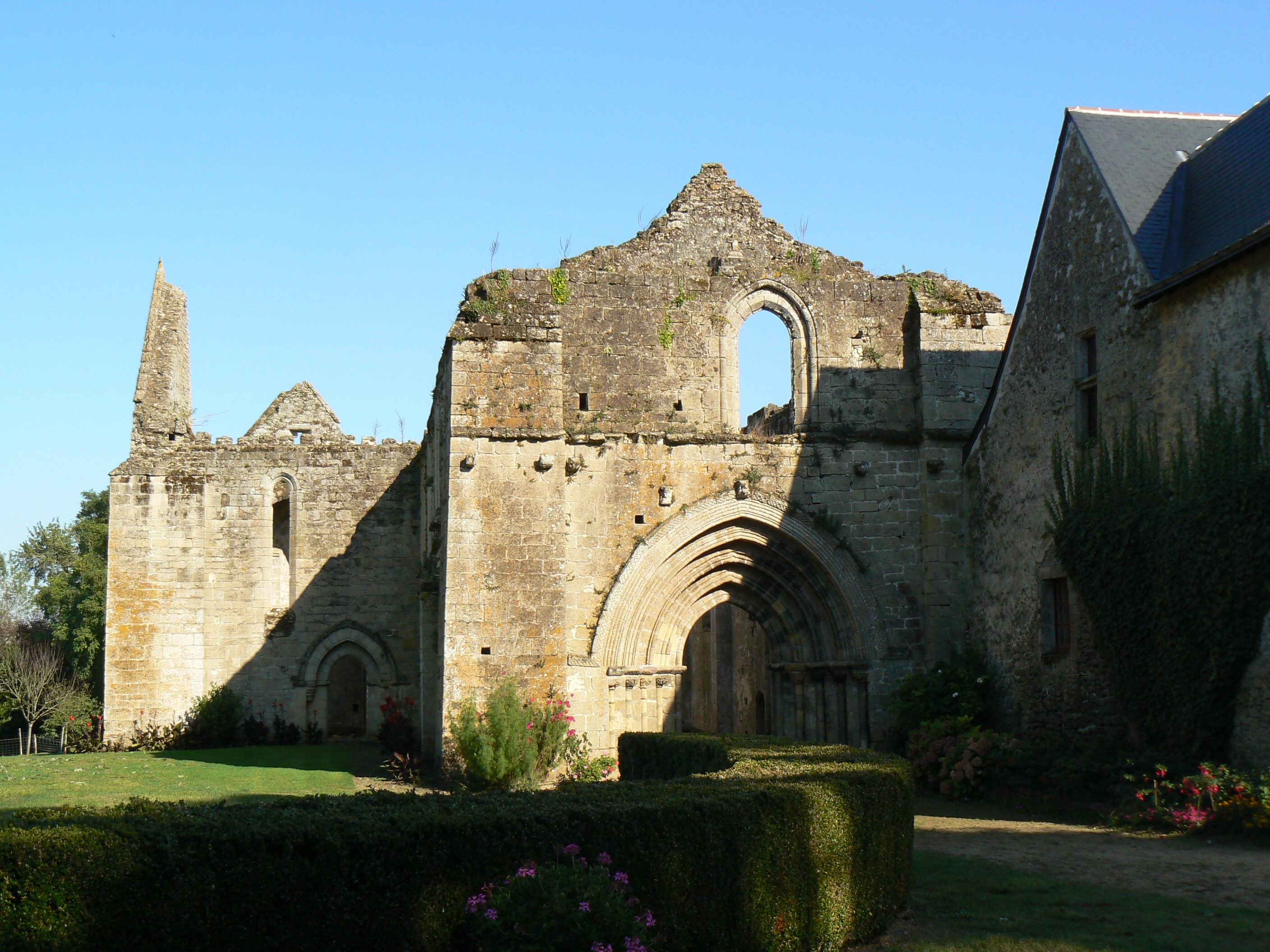
- View in 2009 of the ruins of the Île-Chauvet Abbey.
Date	6 December 1793
Location	Between Bois-de-Céné and Châteauneuf
Result	Vendéan victory

Belligerents
French First Republic	Royalist forces

Commanders and leaders
• Nicolas Haxo	• François Athanase Charette de La Contrie •Jean-Baptiste de Couëtus • Louis Guérin

The Battle of Bois-de-Céné took place on 6 December 1793 during the War in the Vendée between the forces of the French First Republic and royalist forces.

== Prelude and forces ==
On 6 December 1793, the royalist military officer François de Charette managed to escape from the island of Bouin with part of his troops after being defeated by Republican forces under adjutant general Jordy. At 3 p.m., he reached Châteauneuf. His army numbered 800 survivors according to Jordy's estimate, or 1,200 according to Republican lieutenant-colonel Dominique Aubertin.

By the end of the day, the Vendéans encountered between Bois-de-Céné and Châteauneuf a Republican convoy escorting ammunition caissons. The Republican force consisted of 300 infantry and a few cavalrymen according to the memoirs of Vendéan officer Pierre-Suzanne Lucas de La Championnière and 400 men according to Charles-Joseph Auvynet.

According to the anonymous memoirs of a military administrator, the detachment comprised 300 men from the 3rd Battalion of Ille-et-Vilaine Volunteers and a company of cavalry from Nantes, led by General Nicolas Haxo. However, in his own memoirs, Aubertin—who claims to rely on Haxo's testimony—states that the general had only 80 infantrymen from an Ille-et-Vilaine battalion, twelve Nantes cavalrymen, and his staff.

== Battle ==
The fighting took place between Bois-de-Céné and Châteauneuf, not far from the Île-Chauvet Abbey. The various accounts do not fully agree on how the battle unfolded. According to Lucas de La Championnière, (Note: Having escaped an extreme danger, the army could hardly fail to perish amidst the enemy who occupied all the surrounding positions, wandering aimlessly without powder or cavalry. Monsieur Charette himself was on foot and refused to mount the only horse that had been saved; a second miracle soon provided us with new means of defense.) the Vendéans quickly routed the Republicans after answering "Republicans!" to the challenge "Who goes there?". However, Republican reinforcements arrived from Bois-de-Céné and the Île-Chauvet and re-engaged in the fighting in an attempt to retake the caissons. The Republicans ended their pursuit at nightfall.

According to the military administrator, (Note: The enemy took the road to the Bois de Sené and unexpectedly fell upon General Haxo, who had with him only three hundred infantrymen (the 3rd battalion of Ille-et-Vilaine) and a company of Nantes cavalry. The attack was so sudden and so fierce that these horsemen scarcely had time to mount; several, no longer seeing the general and not knowing where he had rallied and drawn up his troops in battle order, fell back upon the eighteen hundred men commanded by the adjutant-generals Sainte-Suzanne, Chadeau, and Mangin. Meanwhile, Haxo, at the head of his small Ille-et-Vilaine battalion, fought heroically and long contested the ground that remained to him; unfortunately, his valor could not prevent the royalists from capturing and carrying off two ammunition caissons, a valuable prize that amounted to a victory for them at a time when they no longer had powder mills. Yet it was a victory for the general not to have succumbed to the enemy's numbers and impetuosity. Towards evening, he sent to ascertain whether the adjutant-generals Sainte-Suzanne, Chadeau, and Mangin were still at their posts: no one was found there. Based on the reports made to them, not knowing what had become of the general—whom they presumed captured or killed—and uncertain of the enemy's numbers, which rumor had exaggerated, they had judged it prudent to retreat to Port-Saint-Père. Passing through Machecoul, they ordered the commissary of war who had remained there to evacuate his field hospital and supplies to the same place. News of a defeat and of the general's death soon spread to Nantes and reached the ears of Carrier, who flew into a terrible rage against the three adjutant-generals because of their retreat. However, when Haxo learned that they were at Port-Saint-Père, he informed them that he had remained master of the country and ordered them to rejoin him with their troops at Machecoul. He explained how he had withstood the shock of an enemy five times more numerous than himself, and what courage had been shown by his Ille-et-Vilaine battalion, which he henceforth called the "battalion of heroes." He lavished them with marks of affection and defended them before Carrier, who wanted to have them arrested and brought before his tribunal bound hand and foot. The first to boast of the capture of the Île de Bouin was General Dutruy, who had not taken part in it. In addition to the three hundred republicans who were freed there, a large supply of grain of all kinds was found, which proved of great assistance to the army and to the city of Nantes, which lacked provisions) the cavalry fled at the very beginning of the attack, but General Haxo put up prolonged resistance with the Ille-et-Vilaine battalion. However, he was unable to prevent the royalists from capturing several caissons.

According to Adjutant General Aubertin, (Note: The brigade commander Jordy was ordered to remain on the Île de Bouin to prevent the royalists from returning; and Commander Aubertin, whose column had not left the mainland, after capturing the redoubt of the mill, returned to Beauvoir, where General Haxo came to review the troops. The latter recounted to the commander that, having established his headquarters during the attack on the Île de Bouin in a house at Bois-de-Cené, guarded only by a detachment of eighty men from an Ille-et-Vilaine battalion and twelve Nantes cavalrymen, he and his staff had run considerable danger. They were gathered in the house, and the detachment posted nearby, when a sentry raised the alarm by firing his musket and shouting, "Here are the Vendéens!" At this unexpected cry, the general and his officers rushed outside and saw a group of royalists, who were no less surprised to encounter the republicans in their path. The enemy column halted and seemed inclined to withdraw. Haxo took advantage of this hesitation to mount his horse, as did his staff and the Nantes cavalry; the small infantry detachment was already under arms. The Vendéens did not suspect that the general could be present with so few men, especially when they heard him loudly giving orders for battalions—whose names he called out—to advance, and saw the confident bearing of the handful of brave men before them. After a few moments, they realized the ruse; but, fearing that the resistance of this small force might give time for reinforcements to arrive, they continued their march through the forest and limited themselves to carrying off an ammunition caisson placed some distance from the house, which had not been secured. A few shots were exchanged, without notable losses on either side. Charette, upon leaving the marshes, soaked and chilled, had changed his clothes for those of a miller at whose house he had stopped. He was at the head of the column that had just passed before General Haxo.) the alarm was raised while Haxo and his staff were gathered in a house. Both sides were surprised by the encounter, and the Vendéans hesitated to launch an attack. They eventually realized the small number of Republican troops, but withdrew for fear of the arrival of reinforcements. According to Aubertin, the engagement was limited to the exchange of a few gunshots.

After the engagement, Haxo withdrew to Beauvoir-sur-Mer., while the Vendéans retreated toward Saint-Étienne-de-Mer-Morte.

== Losses ==
This victory, described as a "miracle" by Lucas de La Championnière, allowed the Vendéans to seize ammunition, weapons, and around thirty horses. The number of captured caissons varies according to the sources: one according to Aubertin, two according to the military administrator, and three according to Lucas de La Championnière and Le Bouvier-Desmortiers.,

The casualties are unknown. According to the memoirs of Charles-Joseph Auvynet, the men of the escort were "almost entirely slaughtered." According to Le Bouvier-Desmortiers, the escort lost three-quarters of its men, and six Republicans were reportedly captured at Châteauneuf before the battle. However, according to the memoirs of Adjutant General Aubertin, the engagement ended "without notable losses on either side."

== Legacy ==
In December 2023, on the 230 year anniversary of the battle, the Chateauneuf municipality installed two information panels, giving an overview of the battle. One panel is on a cycle track between Chateauneuf and Bois-de-Céné, the other panel is behind the cemetery on the footpath towards the abbey.

== Bibliography ==
- Le Bouvier-Desmortiers, Urbain-René-Thomas (1809). Réfutation des calomnies publiées contre le général Charette [Refutation of the calumnies published against General Charette].
