= Saint-Étienne-du-Bois =

Saint-Étienne-du-Bois may refer to two places in France:

- Saint-Étienne-du-Bois, Ain
- Saint-Étienne-du-Bois, Vendée
