= Saint-Christophe-du-Ligneron =

- Commune
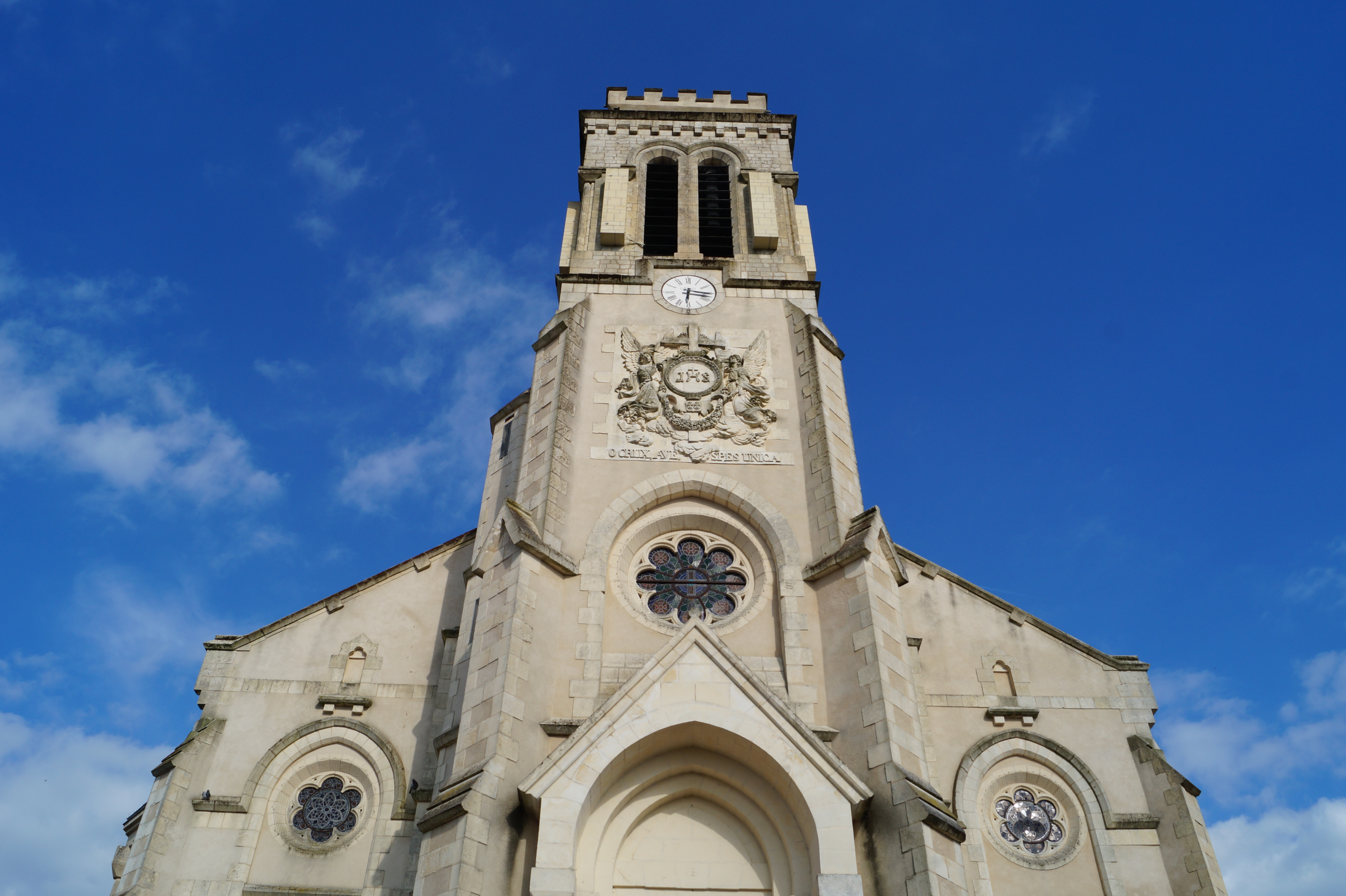

- Coat of arms
- Location of Saint-Christophe-du-Ligneron
- Location within France Location within Pays de la Loire
- Coordinates: 46°49′30″N 1°45′43″W
- Country: France
- Region: Pays de la Loire
- Department: Vendée
- Arrondissement: Les Sables-d'Olonne
- Canton: Challans

Government
  - Mayor (2020–2026): Thierry Richardeau
- Area^{1}: 42.42 km^{2} (16.38 sq mi)
- Highest elevation: 69 m (226 ft)
- Lowest elevation: 15 m (49 ft)
- Population (2023): 2,727
  - Density: 64.29/km^{2} (166.5/sq mi)
- Time zone: UTC+01:00 (CET)
  - Summer (DST): UTC+02:00 (CEST)
- INSEE/Postal code: 85204 /85670
- ^{1} French Land Register data, which excludes lakes, ponds, glaciers > 1 km^{2} (0.386 sq mi or 247 acres) and river estuaries.

Saint-Christophe-du-Ligneron (French pronunciation: [sɛ̃ kʁistɔf dy liɲʁɔ̃]) is a commune in the Vendée department in the Pays de la Loire region in western France.

== Population ==
Historical population
Year	Pop.	±% p.a.
1968	1,407	—
1975	1,390	−0.17%
1982	1,449	+0.60%
1990	1,434	−0.13%
1999	1,630	+1.43%
2007	2,226	+3.97%
2012	2,522	+2.53%
2017	2,554	+0.25%
2023	2,727	+1.10%
Source: INSEE

== See also ==
- Communes of the Vendée department
