= Canton of Challans =

Coordinates: 46.85°N 1.88°W

The canton of Challans is an administrative division of the Vendée department, western France. Its borders were modified at the French canton reorganisation which came into effect in March 2015. Its seat is in Challans.

It consists of the following communes:

1. Apremont
2. Bois-de-Céné
3. Challans
4. La Chapelle-Palluau
5. Châteauneuf
6. Falleron
7. Froidfond
8. La Garnache
9. Grand'Landes
10. Maché
11. Palluau
12. Saint-Christophe-du-Ligneron
13. Saint-Étienne-du-Bois
14. Saint-Paul-Mont-Penit
15. Sallertaine
