= Sallertaine =

- Commune
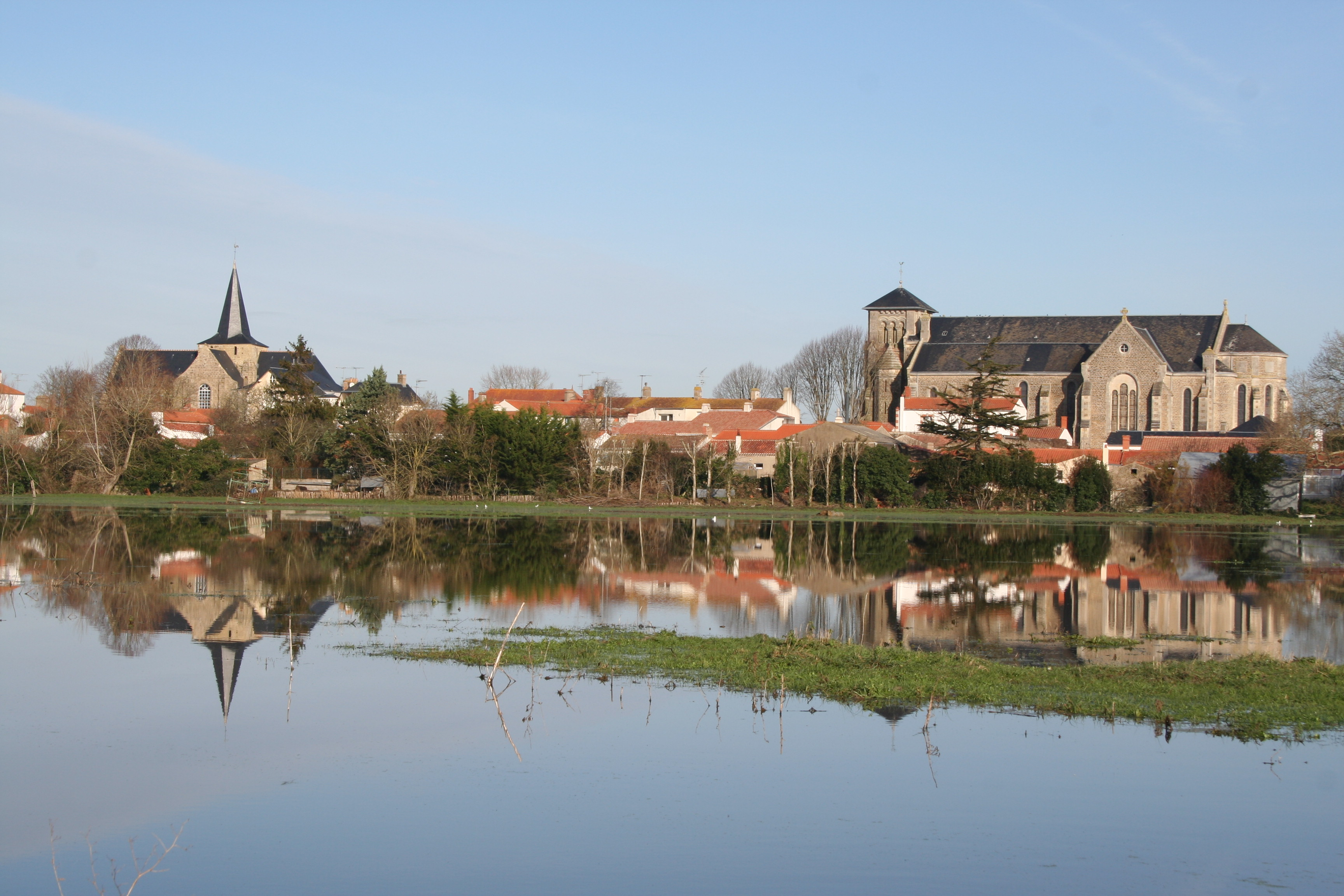
- The two churches in Sallertaine

- Coat of arms
- Location of Sallertaine
- Location within France Location within Pays de la Loire
- Coordinates: 46°51′38″N 1°57′21″W
- Country: France
- Region: Pays de la Loire
- Department: Vendée
- Arrondissement: Les Sables-d'Olonne
- Canton: Challans

Government
  - Mayor (2020–2026): Jean-Luc Menuet
- Area^{1}: 49.45 km^{2} (19.09 sq mi)
- Highest elevation: 18 m (59 ft)
- Lowest elevation: 0 m (0 ft)
- Population (2023): 3,518
  - Density: 71.14/km^{2} (184.3/sq mi)
- Time zone: UTC+01:00 (CET)
  - Summer (DST): UTC+02:00 (CEST)
- INSEE/Postal code: 85280 /85300
- ^{1} French Land Register data, which excludes lakes, ponds, glaciers > 1 km^{2} (0.386 sq mi or 247 acres) and river estuaries.

Sallertaine (French pronunciation: [salɛʁtɛn]) is a commune in the Vendée department in the Pays de la Loire region in western France.

Apart from the two historical churches, the village is well known as an arts and crafts community due to the number of independent craftsmen and women who occupy various outlets, often in former homes, during the summer months. These range from potters and painters to jewellers and purveyors of fine, local foods. There is also a bread making museum that uses multi-lingual audio-commentary to illustrate how French artisan bakers make their famous products. It is possible for visitors to try their hand at bread making. On several evenings during the summer the village has live entertainment attracting French and foreign visitors. The village is also a centre for canoe hire from where the local salt marshes can be explored, including guided tours.

== Population ==
Historical population
Year	Pop.	±% p.a.
1968	1,784	—
1975	2,080	+2.22%
1982	2,325	+1.60%
1990	2,245	−0.44%
1999	2,235	−0.05%
2007	2,684	+2.31%
2012	2,832	+1.08%
2017	3,099	+1.82%
2023	3,518	+2.14%
Source: INSEE

== See also ==
- Communes of the Vendée department
