= Saint-Paul-Mont-Penit =

- Commune
- Location of Saint-Paul-Mont-Penit
- Location within France Location within Pays de la Loire
- Coordinates: 46°47′54″N 1°39′32″W
- Country: France
- Region: Pays de la Loire
- Department: Vendée
- Arrondissement: La Roche-sur-Yon
- Canton: Challans
- Intercommunality: Vie et Boulogne

Government
  - Mayor (2020–2026): Philippe Crochet
- Area^{1}: 16.58 km^{2} (6.40 sq mi)
- Highest elevation: 71 m (233 ft)
- Lowest elevation: 12 m (39 ft)
- Population (2023): 880
  - Density: 53/km^{2} (140/sq mi)
- Time zone: UTC+01:00 (CET)
  - Summer (DST): UTC+02:00 (CEST)
- INSEE/Postal code: 85260 /85670
- ^{1} French Land Register data, which excludes lakes, ponds, glaciers > 1 km^{2} (0.386 sq mi or 247 acres) and river estuaries.

Saint-Paul-Mont-Penit (French pronunciation: [sɛ̃ pɔl mɔ̃ pəni]) is a commune in the Vendée department in the Pays de la Loire region in western France.

== See also ==
- Communes of the Vendée department
