= Palluau =

- Commune
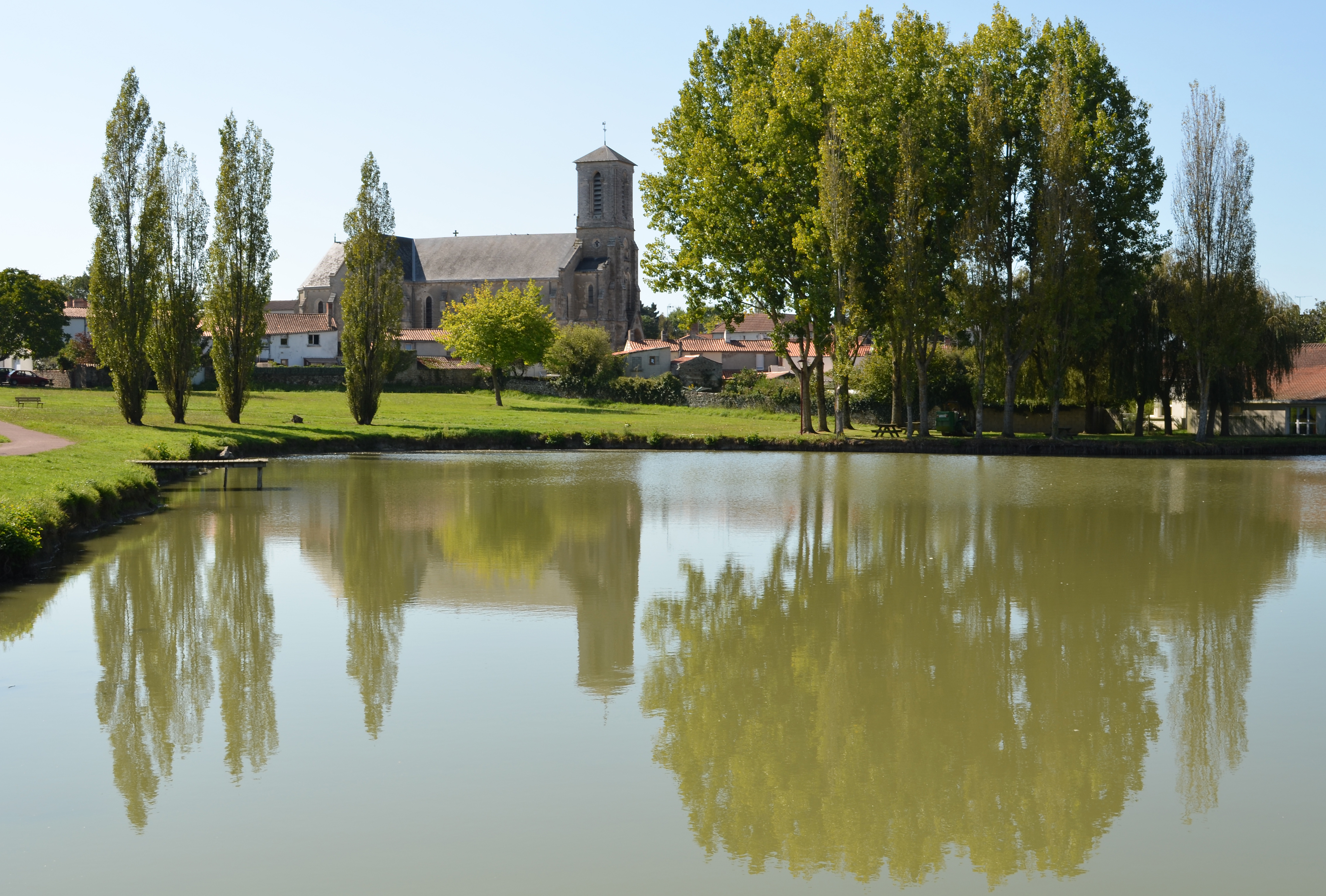
- The church and lake in Palluau

- Coat of arms
- Location of Palluau
- Location within France Location within Pays de la Loire
- Coordinates: 46°48′21″N 1°37′06″W
- Country: France
- Region: Pays de la Loire
- Department: Vendée
- Arrondissement: La Roche-sur-Yon
- Canton: Challans

Government
  - Mayor (2020–2026): Marcelle Barreteau
- Area^{1}: 7.43 km^{2} (2.87 sq mi)
- Highest elevation: 64 m (210 ft)
- Lowest elevation: 18 m (59 ft)
- Population (2023): 1,128
  - Density: 152/km^{2} (393/sq mi)
- Time zone: UTC+01:00 (CET)
  - Summer (DST): UTC+02:00 (CEST)
- INSEE/Postal code: 85169 /85670
- ^{1} French Land Register data, which excludes lakes, ponds, glaciers > 1 km^{2} (0.386 sq mi or 247 acres) and river estuaries.

Palluau (French pronunciation: [palɥo]) is a commune in the Vendée department in the Pays de la Loire region in western France.

== Geography ==
=== Climate ===
Palluau has an oceanic climate (Köppen climate classification Cfb). The average annual temperature in Palluau is 12.6 °C (54.7 °F). The average annual rainfall is 928.6 mm (36.56 in) with November as the wettest month. The temperatures are highest on average in August, at around 19.7 °C (67.5 °F), and lowest in January, at around 6.3 °C (43.3 °F). The highest temperature ever recorded in Palluau was 43.8 °C (110.8 °F) on 24 June 2026; the coldest temperature ever recorded was −10.6 °C (12.9 °F) on 2 January 1997.

Climate data for Palluau (1991−2020 normals, extremes 1989−present)
Month	Jan	Feb	Mar	Apr	May	Jun	Jul	Aug	Sep	Oct	Nov	Dec	Year
Record high °C (°F)	17.0 (62.6)	22.7 (72.9)	24.4 (75.9)	29.0 (84.2)	32.4 (90.3)	39.3 (102.7)	41.7 (107.1)	40.4 (104.7)	34.7 (94.5)	30.8 (87.4)	21.1 (70.0)	17.8 (64.0)	41.7 (107.1)
Mean daily maximum °C (°F)	9.5 (49.1)	10.6 (51.1)	13.7 (56.7)	16.5 (61.7)	20.1 (68.2)	23.7 (74.7)	25.9 (78.6)	26.2 (79.2)	23.0 (73.4)	18.0 (64.4)	13.1 (55.6)	10.0 (50.0)	17.5 (63.5)
Daily mean °C (°F)	6.3 (43.3)	6.6 (43.9)	8.9 (48.0)	11.0 (51.8)	14.5 (58.1)	17.7 (63.9)	19.7 (67.5)	19.7 (67.5)	17.0 (62.6)	13.6 (56.5)	9.4 (48.9)	6.8 (44.2)	12.6 (54.7)
Mean daily minimum °C (°F)	3.1 (37.6)	2.6 (36.7)	4.2 (39.6)	5.6 (42.1)	9.0 (48.2)	11.8 (53.2)	13.4 (56.1)	13.3 (55.9)	10.9 (51.6)	9.3 (48.7)	5.8 (42.4)	3.5 (38.3)	7.7 (45.9)
Record low °C (°F)	−10.6 (12.9)	−10.4 (13.3)	−10.2 (13.6)	−4.0 (24.8)	−1.9 (28.6)	3.3 (37.9)	6.3 (43.3)	5.2 (41.4)	1.4 (34.5)	−3.3 (26.1)	−7.5 (18.5)	−9.6 (14.7)	−10.6 (12.9)
Average precipitation mm (inches)	100.4 (3.95)	79.5 (3.13)	67.3 (2.65)	68.8 (2.71)	66.0 (2.60)	49.1 (1.93)	47.1 (1.85)	54.9 (2.16)	69.2 (2.72)	100.6 (3.96)	113.5 (4.47)	112.2 (4.42)	928.6 (36.56)
Average precipitation days (≥ 1.0 mm)	13.3	11.3	10.9	10.5	9.6	8.0	7.5	7.9	8.2	12.4	13.6	14.2	127.2
Source: Météo-France

== See also ==
- Communes of the Vendée department
