= Bois-de-Céné =

- Commune
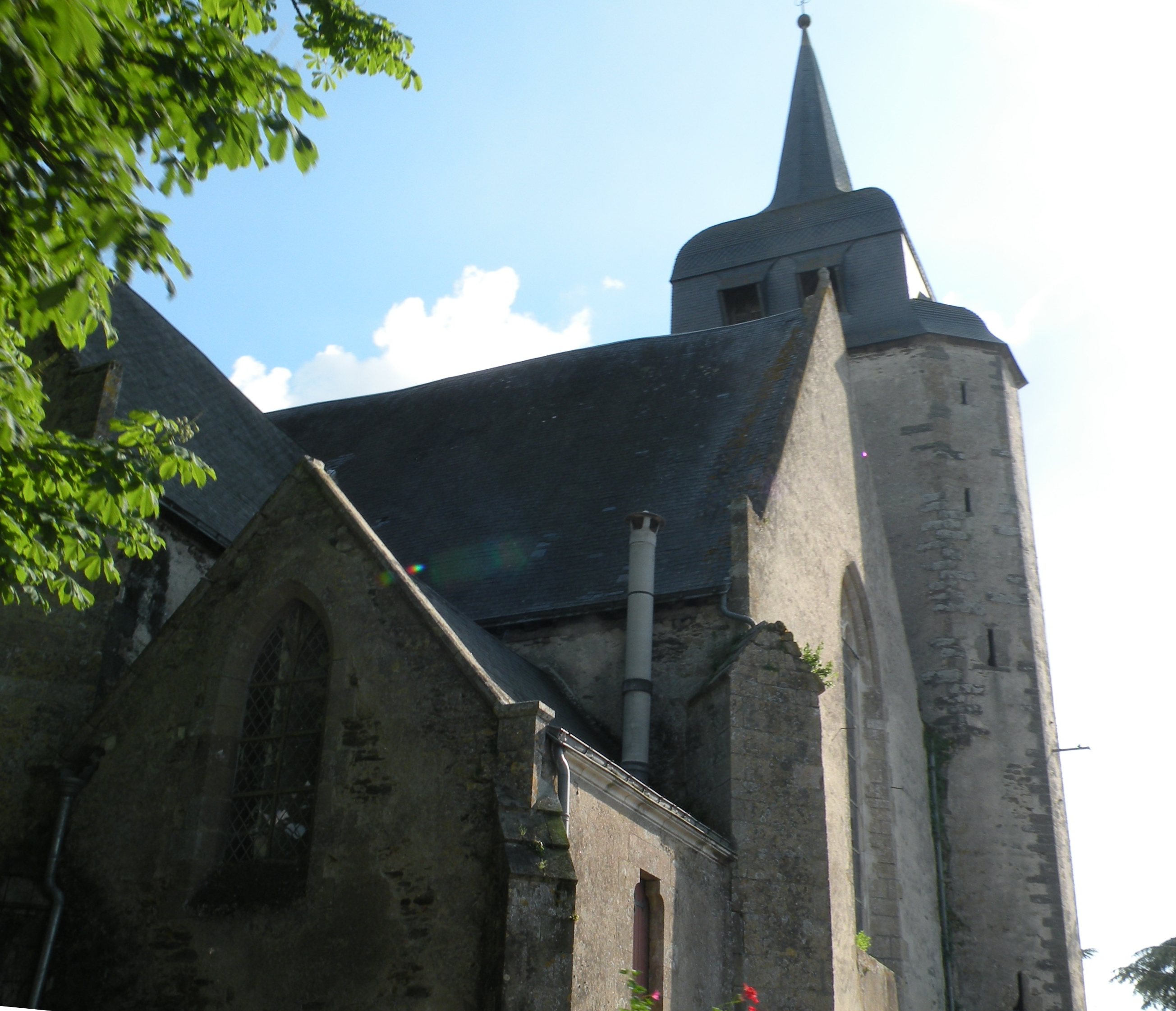
- The church in Bois-de-Céné

- Coat of arms
- Location of Bois-de-Céné
- Location within France Location within Pays de la Loire
- Coordinates: 46°56′20″N 1°53′03″W
- Country: France
- Region: Pays de la Loire
- Department: Vendée
- Arrondissement: Les Sables-d'Olonne
- Canton: Challans
- Intercommunality: Challans-Gois Communauté

Government
  - Mayor (2020–2026): Yoann Grall
- Area^{1}: 41.89 km^{2} (16.17 sq mi)
- Highest elevation: 42 m (138 ft)
- Lowest elevation: 0 m (0 ft)
- Population (2023): 2,256
  - Density: 53.86/km^{2} (139.5/sq mi)
- Time zone: UTC+01:00 (CET)
  - Summer (DST): UTC+02:00 (CEST)
- INSEE/Postal code: 85024 /85710
- ^{1} French Land Register data, which excludes lakes, ponds, glaciers > 1 km^{2} (0.386 sq mi or 247 acres) and river estuaries.

Bois-de-Céné (French pronunciation: [bwa də səne], Bois-de-Cené) is a commune in the Vendée department in the Pays de la Loire region in western France.

== Population ==
Historical population
Year	Pop.	±% p.a.
1968	1,301	—
1975	1,214	−0.98%
1982	1,251	+0.43%
1990	1,232	−0.19%
1999	1,263	+0.28%
2007	1,477	+1.98%
2012	1,800	+4.03%
2017	2,001	+2.14%
2023	2,256	+2.02%
Source: INSEE

== See also ==
- Communes of the Vendée department
- Battle of Bois-de-Céné
