= Grand'Landes =

- Commune
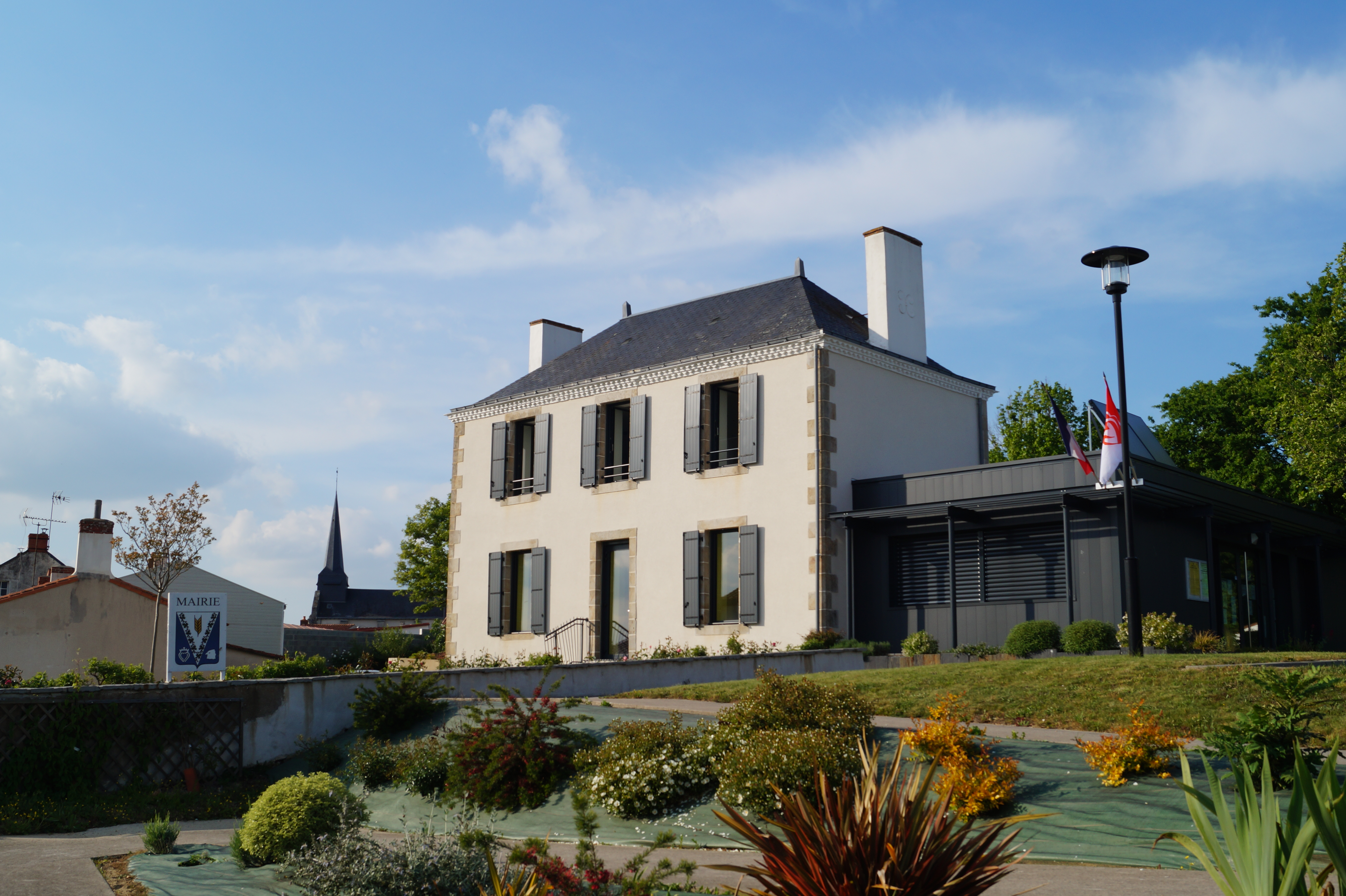

- Coat of arms
- Location of Grand'Landes
- Location within France Location within Pays de la Loire
- Coordinates: 46°49′18″N 1°38′56″W
- Country: France
- Region: Pays de la Loire
- Department: Vendée
- Arrondissement: La Roche-sur-Yon
- Canton: Challans

Government
  - Mayor (2020–2026): Pascal Morineau
- Area^{1}: 20.49 km^{2} (7.91 sq mi)
- Highest elevation: 71 m (233 ft)
- Lowest elevation: 20 m (66 ft)
- Population (2023): 725
  - Density: 35.4/km^{2} (91.6/sq mi)
- Time zone: UTC+01:00 (CET)
  - Summer (DST): UTC+02:00 (CEST)
- INSEE/Postal code: 85102 /85670
- ^{1} French Land Register data, which excludes lakes, ponds, glaciers > 1 km^{2} (0.386 sq mi or 247 acres) and river estuaries.

Grand'Landes (French pronunciation: [ɡʁɑ̃lɑ̃d]) is a commune in the Vendée department in the Pays de la Loire region in western France.

== See also ==
- Communes of the Vendée department
