= Saint-Étienne-du-Bois, Vendée =

Saint-Étienne-du-Bois
- Commune
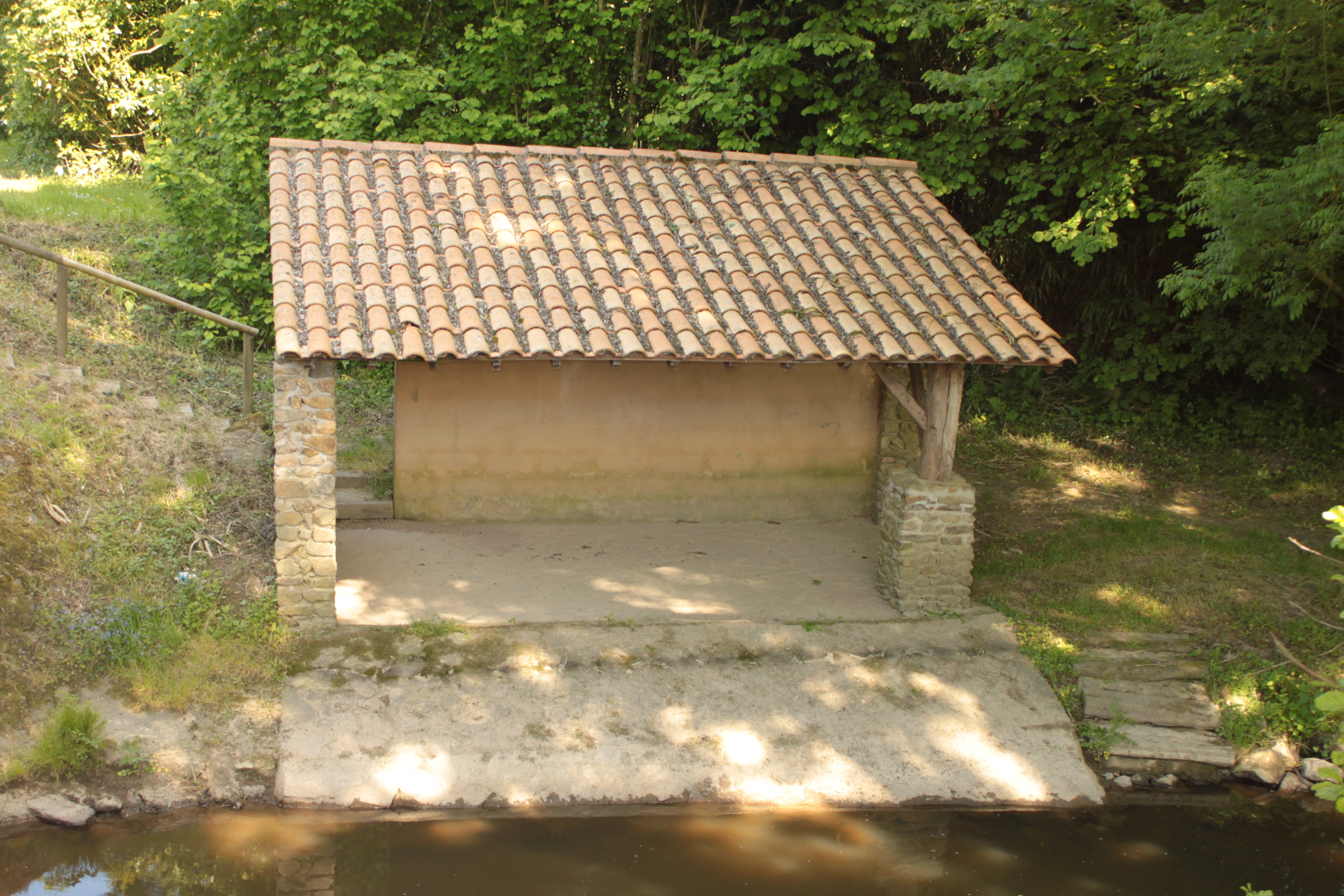
- The washing house

- Coat of arms
- Location of Saint-Étienne-du-Bois
- Location within France Location within Pays de la Loire
- Coordinates: 46°49′55″N 1°35′37″W
- Country: France
- Region: Pays de la Loire
- Department: Vendée
- Arrondissement: La Roche-sur-Yon
- Canton: Challans
- Intercommunality: Vie et Boulogne

Government
  - Mayor (2020–2026): Guy Airiau
- Area^{1}: 29.44 km^{2} (11.37 sq mi)
- Highest elevation: 64 m (210 ft)
- Lowest elevation: 17 m (56 ft)
- Population (2023): 2,311
  - Density: 78.50/km^{2} (203.3/sq mi)
- Time zone: UTC+01:00 (CET)
  - Summer (DST): UTC+02:00 (CEST)
- INSEE/Postal code: 85210 /85670
- ^{1} French Land Register data, which excludes lakes, ponds, glaciers > 1 km^{2} (0.386 sq mi or 247 acres) and river estuaries.

Saint-Étienne-du-Bois (French pronunciation: [sɛ̃.t‿etjɛn dy bwa]) is a commune in the Vendée department in the Pays de la Loire region in western France.

== Population ==
Historical population
Year	Pop.	±% p.a.
1968	1,686	—
1975	1,494	−1.71%
1982	1,478	−0.15%
1990	1,416	−0.53%
1999	1,451	+0.27%
2007	1,666	+1.74%
2012	2,028	+4.01%
2017	2,101	+0.71%
2023	2,311	+1.60%
Source: INSEE

== Places and Monuments ==
=== The Chapel of Tulévrière ===
In the hamlet of Tulévrière, stands a small chapel, only monument Catholic erected during the Vendée wars . It was erected by the inhabitants of the locality, at the request of the priest Alexandre Ténèbre, refractory priest in 1794 who gave it the name "Our Lady of Martyrs of Lower Poitou".

Inaugurated on 29 December 1794, it was intended to thank the Virgin of the protection afforded to the village during the passage of infernal columns in March of that year.

Rebuilt in 1835, it was decorated with stained glass for the occasion

== See also ==
- Communes of the Vendée department
