= Falleron =

- Commune
- Coat of arms
- Location of Falleron
- Location within France Location within Pays de la Loire
- Coordinates: 46°52′59″N 1°42′09″W
- Country: France
- Region: Pays de la Loire
- Department: Vendée
- Arrondissement: La Roche-sur-Yon
- Canton: Challans

Government
  - Mayor (2020–2026): Gérard Tenaud
- Area^{1}: 28.64 km^{2} (11.06 sq mi)
- Highest elevation: 69 m (226 ft)
- Lowest elevation: 22 m (72 ft)
- Population (2023): 1,725
  - Density: 60.23/km^{2} (156.0/sq mi)
- Time zone: UTC+01:00 (CET)
  - Summer (DST): UTC+02:00 (CEST)
- INSEE/Postal code: 85086 /85670
- ^{1} French Land Register data, which excludes lakes, ponds, glaciers > 1 km^{2} (0.386 sq mi or 247 acres) and river estuaries.

Falleron (French pronunciation: [falʁɔ̃]) is a commune in the Vendée department in the Pays de la Loire region in western France.

== See also ==
- Communes of the Vendée department
