= Froidfond =

- Commune
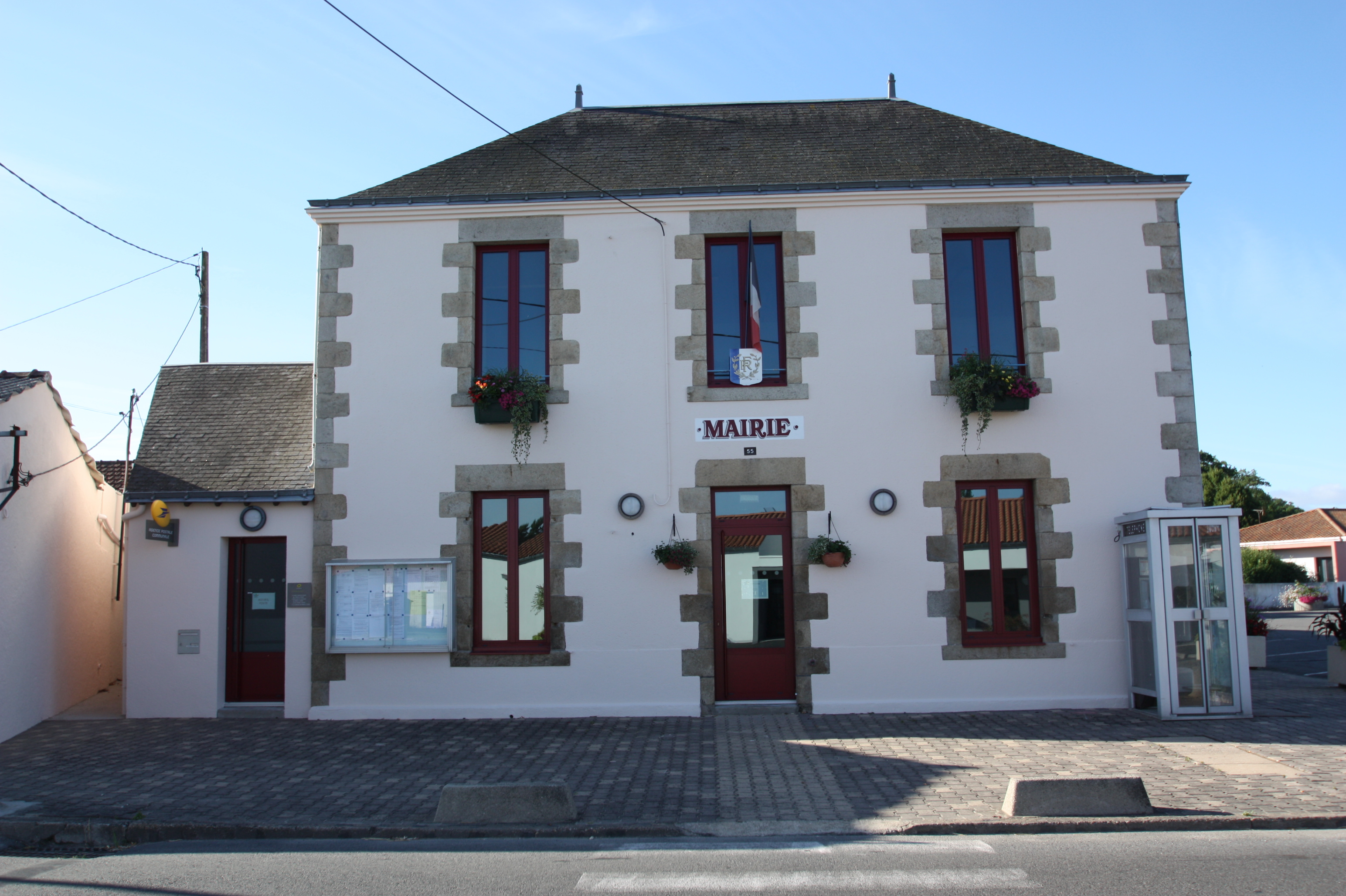
- Town hall of Froidfond
- Location of Froidfond
- Location within France Location within Pays de la Loire
- Coordinates: 46°52′12″N 1°45′24″W
- Country: France
- Region: Pays de la Loire
- Department: Vendée
- Arrondissement: Les Sables-d'Olonne
- Canton: Challans

Government
  - Mayor (2020–2026): Philippe Guerin
- Area^{1}: 21.51 km^{2} (8.31 sq mi)
- Highest elevation: 64 m (210 ft)
- Lowest elevation: 17 m (56 ft)
- Population (2023): 2,208
  - Density: 102.6/km^{2} (265.9/sq mi)
- Time zone: UTC+01:00 (CET)
  - Summer (DST): UTC+02:00 (CEST)
- INSEE/Postal code: 85095 /85300
- ^{1} French Land Register data, which excludes lakes, ponds, glaciers > 1 km^{2} (0.386 sq mi or 247 acres) and river estuaries.

Froidfond (French pronunciation: [fʁwafɔ̃]) is a commune in the Vendée department in the Pays de la Loire region in western France.

== Population ==
Historical population
Year	Pop.	±% p.a.
1968	756	—
1975	743	−0.25%
1982	820	+1.42%
1990	878	+0.86%
1999	929	+0.63%
2007	1,245	+3.73%
2012	1,676	+6.13%
2017	1,876	+2.28%
2023	2,208	+2.75%
Source: INSEE

== See also ==
- Communes of the Vendée department
