= Saint-Étienne-de-Mer-Morte =

Saint-Étienne-de-Mer-Morte Sant-Stefan-Melveurzh (Breton)
- Commune
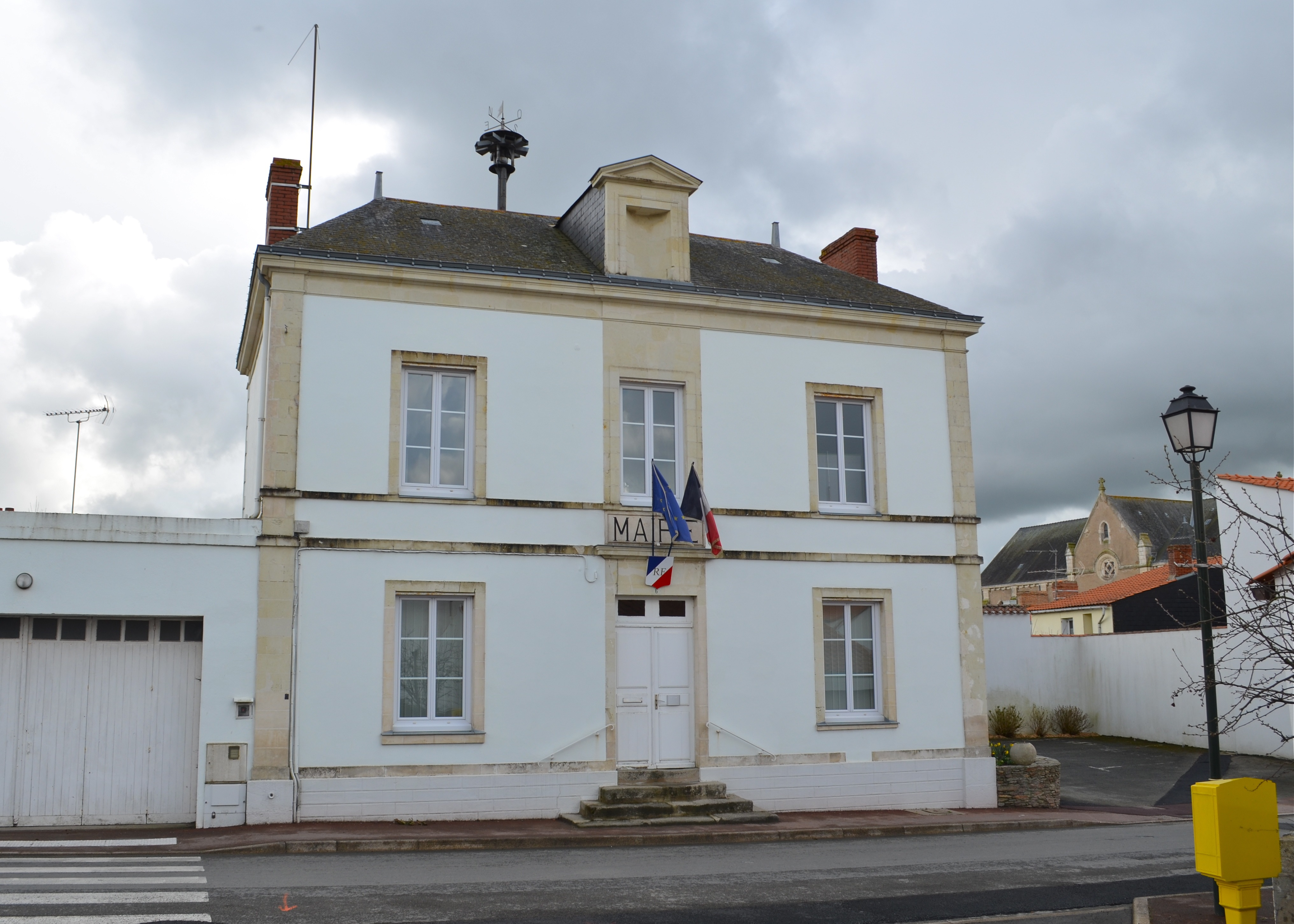
- Town hall

- Coat of arms
- Location of Saint-Étienne-de-Mer-Morte
- Location within France Location within Pays de la Loire
- Coordinates: 46°55′50″N 1°44′29″W
- Country: France
- Region: Pays de la Loire
- Department: Loire-Atlantique
- Arrondissement: Nantes
- Canton: Machecoul-Saint-Même
- Intercommunality: Sud Retz Atlantique

Government
  - Mayor (2020–2026): Manuella Pelletier-Sorin
- Area^{1}: 27.33 km^{2} (10.55 sq mi)
- Elevation: 40 m (130 ft)
- Highest elevation: 47 m (154 ft)
- Lowest elevation: 9 m (30 ft)
- Population (2023): 1,782
  - Density: 65.20/km^{2} (168.9/sq mi)
- Time zone: UTC+01:00 (CET)
  - Summer (DST): UTC+02:00 (CEST)
- INSEE/Postal code: 44157 /44270
- ^{1} French Land Register data, which excludes lakes, ponds, glaciers > 1 km^{2} (0.386 sq mi or 247 acres) and river estuaries.

Saint-Étienne-de-Mer-Morte (French pronunciation: [sɛ̃.t‿etjɛn də mɛʁ mɔʁt]; Breton: Sant-Stefan-Melveurzh) is a commune in the Loire-Atlantique department in western France.

== Population ==
Historical population
Year	Pop.	±% p.a.
1968	1,169	—
1975	1,078	−1.15%
1982	995	−1.14%
1990	1,041	+0.57%
1999	1,003	−0.41%
2007	1,273	+3.02%
2012	1,590	+4.55%
2017	1,733	+1.74%
2023	1,782	+0.47%
Source: INSEE

== See also ==
- Communes of the Loire-Atlantique department
