= List of windmills in Vendée =

A list of windmills in Vendée, France.

Location	Name of mill	Type	Built	Notes	Photograph
Avrillé	Moulin d'Avrillé	Moulin Tour		Moulins a Vent (in French)	
Barbâtre	Moulin de la Fosse	Moulin Tour		Moulins a Vent (in French)	
Barbâtre	Moulin de la Frandière	Moulin Tour		Moulins a Vent (in French)	
Barbâtre	Vieux Moulin	Moulin Tour		Moulins a Vent (in French)	
Barbâtre	Moulin de la Plaine	Moulin Tour		Moulins a Vent (in French)	
Barbâtre	Moulin des Onchères #1	Moulin Tour		Moulins a Vent (in French)	
Barbâtre	Moulin des Onchères #2	Moulin Tour		Moulins a Vent (in French)	
Barbâtre	Moulin des Yuccas	Moulin Tour		Moulins a Vent (in French)	
Barbâtre	Moulin Plage du Midi	Moulin Tour		Moulins a Vent (in French)	
Bazoges-en-Pareds	Moulin Garnier	Moulin Tour		Moulins a Vent (in French)	
Bazoges-en-Pareds	Moulin de la Fambretière	Moulin Tour		Moulins a Vent (in French)	
Beaulieu-sous-la-Roche	Moulin aux Trois Moulins	Moulin Tour		Moulins a Vent (in French)	
Beaulieu-sous-la-Roche	Moulin aux Tessonières #1	Moulin Tour		Moulins a Vent (in French)	
Beaulieu-sous-la-Roche	Moulin aux Tessonières #2	Moulin Tour		Moulins a Vent (in French)	
Beaurepaire	Moulin des Ardilliers	Moulin Tour		Moulins a Vent (in French)	
Beauvoir-sur-Mer	Moulin Ste Catherine	Moulin Tour	17th century	Moulins a Vent (in French)	
Beauvoir-sur-Mer	Moulin de St Esprit	Moulin Tour	1837	Moulins a Vent (in French)	
Belleville-sur-Vie	Moulin de l'Ardouinière	Moulin Tour		Moulins a Vent (in French)	
Bessay	Moulin des Roulières	Moulin Tour		Moulins a Vent (in French)	
Bouillé-Courdault	Moulin de la Tonnelle	Moulin Tour		Moulins a Vent (in French)	
Bouin	Moulin Voisin; Moulin de l'Hôpital	Moulin Tour	19th century	Moulins a Vent (in French)	
Bouin	Moulin du Sud	Moulin Tour		Moulins a Vent (in French)	
Boulogne	Moulin aux Quatre Moulins	Moulin Tour		Moulins a Vent (in French)	
Bournezeau	Moulin de la Cave	Moulin Tour	Early 19th century	Moulins a Vent (in French)	
Brem-sur-Mer	Le Moulin Blanc	Moulin Tour		Moulins a Vent (in French)	
Chaix	Moulin a Chaix	Moulin Tour		Moulins a Vent (in French)	
Champagné-les-Marais	Moulin de la Pironnière	Moulin Tour		Moulins a Vent (in French)	
Chantonnay	Moulin de Fruiteau #1	Moulin Tour		Moulins a Vent (in French)	
Chantonnay	Moulin de Fruiteau #2	Moulin Tour		Moulins a Vent (in French)	
Château-d'Olonne	Moulin de St Jean	Moulin Tour		Moulins a Vent (in French)	
Château-d'Olonne	Moulin du Puits Rochais	Moulin Tour		Moulins a Vent (in French)	
Château-Guibert	Moulin de l'Oucherie	Moulin Tour		Moulins a Vent (in French)	
Châteauneuf	Le Petit Moulin	Moulin Tour	1703	Moulins a Vent (in French)	
Chavagnes-en-Paillers	Moulin aux Rue des Cinq Moulins	Moulin Tour	1880	Moulins a Vent (in French)	
Chavagnes-en-Paillers	Moulin aux le Champ du Moulins #1	Moulin Tour		Moulins a Vent (in French)	
Chavagnes-en-Paillers	Moulin aux le Champ du Moulins #2	Moulin Tour		Moulins a Vent (in French)	
Chavagnes-en-Paillers	Moulin de la Bleure	Moulin Tour		Moulins a Vent (in French)	
Chavagnes-en-Paillers	Moulin de Chavagnes	Moulin Tour		Moulins a Vent (in French)	
Commequiers	Moulin de la Minotière	Moulin Tour		Moulins a Vent (in French)	
Curzon	Le Grand Moulin	Moulin Tour		Moulins a Vent (in French)	
Damvix	Moulin de Goguet	Moulin Tour		Moulins a Vent (in French)	
Dompierre-sur-Yon	Moulin de la Braconnière	Moulin Tour		Moulins a Vent (in French)	
Fontenay-le-Comte	Moulin de Fontenay le Comte	Moulin Tour		Moulins a Vent (in French)	
Fougeré	Moulin de la Grolle	Moulin Tour		Moulins a Vent (in French)	
Fougeré	Moulin de Noailles	Moulin Tour		Moulins a Vent (in French)	
Givrand	Moulin de Chiron	Moulin Tour		Moulins a Vent (in French)	
Jard-sur-Mer	Moulin de la Conchette	Moulin Tour		Moulins a Vent (in French)	
Jard-sur-Mer	Moulin de Bellevue	Moulin Tour		Moulins a Vent (in French)	
Jard-sur-Mer	Moulin Rambaud	Moulin Tour		Ruin; Moulins a Vent (in French)	
L'Aiguillon-sur-Mer	Moulin Rue du Communal	Moulin Tour		Moulins a Vent (in French)	
L'Aiguillon-sur-Mer	Moulin Rue de la Moulinette	Moulin Tour		Moulins a Vent (in French)	
La Barre-de-Monts	Moulin a La Barre de Monts	Moulin Tour		Moulins a Vent (in French)	
La Boissière-des-Landes	Moulin de L'Epinette	Moulin Tour		Moulins a Vent (in French)	
La Chaize-le-Vicomte	Moulin de la Gandouinière	Moulin Tour	1819	Moulins a Vent (in French)	
La Chaize-le-Vicomte	Moulin des Juraires	Moulin Tour		Moulins a Vent (in French)	
La Chapelle-Achard	Moulin des Landes	Moulin Tour		Moulins a Vent (in French)	
La Chapelle-Palluau	Moulin des Roches	Moulin Tour		Moulins a Vent (in French)	
La Couture	Moulin de la Tabarière	Moulin Tour		Ruin; Moulins a Vent (in French)	
La Ferrière	Moulin de la Blaire	Moulin Tour		Moulins a Vent (in French)	
La Ferrière	Le Grand Moulin	Moulin Tour	Late 18th century	Moulins a Vent (in French)	
La Ferrière	Moulin des Landes	Moulin Tour		Moulins a Vent (in French)	
La Gaubretière	Moulin du Drillais	Moulin Tour			
La Génétouze	Moulin de la Davière	Moulin Tour		Miniature mill Moulins a Vent (in French)	
La Génétouze	Moulin de Maison Neuve	Moulin Tour		Moulins a Vent (in French)	
La Guérinière	Moulin d'Amor	Moulin Tour		Moulins a Vent (in French)	
La Guérinière	Moulin de la Cour	Moulin Tour		Moulins a Vent (in French)	
Lairoux	Moulin de la Tonnelle; Moulin de la Tourelle	Moulin Tour		Moulins a Vent (in French)	
La Jaudonnière	Moulin de la Fambretiére	Moulin Tour		Moulins a Vent (in French)	
La Jaudonnière	Moulin de La Jaudonnière #1	Moulin Tour		Moulins a Vent (in French)	
La Jaudonnière	Moulin de La Jaudonnière #2	Moulin Tour		Moulins a Vent (in French)	
La Jaudonnière	Moulin de La Jaudonnière #3	Moulin Tour		Moulins a Vent (in French)	
Landeronde	Moulin Guérin	Moulin Tour		Moulins a Vent (in French)	
Landeronde	Moulin des Richardières	Moulin Tour		Moulins a Vent (in French)	
La Rabatelière	Moulin de Bel-Air	Moulin Tour	19th century	Moulins a Vent (in French)	
La Rabatelière	Moulin Rouge	Moulin Tour		Moulins a Vent (in French)	
La Roche-sur-Yon	Moulin de la Garde	Moulin Tour	14th century	Moulins a Vent (in French)	
La Roche-sur-Yon	Moulin de la Badiole	Moulin Tour		Moulins a Vent (in French)	
La Roche-sur-Yon	Moulin de Boulangerie	Moulin Tour		Moulins a Vent (in French)	
La Taillée	Moulin de la Tublerie	Moulin Tour		Moulins a Vent (in French)	
La Tranche-sur-Mer	Moulin de La Tranche sur Mer	Moulin Tour		Moulins a Vent (in French)	
Le Champ-Saint-Père	Moulin de Le Champ Saint Père	Moulin Tour		Moulins a Vent (in French)	
Le Fenouiller	Moulin au Fenouiller	Moulin Tour		Moulins a Vent (in French)	
Le Fenouiller	Moulin Neuf	Moulin Tour	20th century	Moulins a Vent (in French)	
Le Fier	Moulin des Corps Morts	Moulin Tour		Moulins a Vent (in French)	
Le Givre	Moulin de la Chenilée	Moulin Tour		Moulins a Vent (in French)	
Le Gué-de-Velluire	Moulin de Le Gué de Velleuire	Moulin Tour		Moulins a Vent (in French)	
Le Langon	Moulin à La Lisobe	Moulin Tour		Moulins a Vent (in French)	
Le Langon	Moulin de la Cour	Moulin Tour		Moulins a Vent (in French)	
Le Perrier	Moulin des Loires	Moulin Tour		Moulins a Vent (in French)	
Le Perrier	Moulin de la Chausée	Moulin Tour		Moulins a Vent (in French)	
L'Épine	Moulin de la Bosse	Moulin Tour		Moulins a Vent (in French)	
L'Épine	Moulin du Boucard	Moulin Tour		Moulins a Vent (in French)	
Le Poiré-sur-Vie	Moulin à Élise				
Les Brouzils	Moulin de la Sauvetrière	Moulin Tour		Moulins a Vent (in French)	
Les Brouzils	Moulin de Maison Neuve	Moulin Tour		Moulins a Vent (in French)	
Les Brouzils	Moulin de la Minoterie	Moulin Tour		Moulins a Vent (in French)	
Les Clouzeaux	Moulin de la Polka	Moulin Tour		Moulins a Vent (in French)	
Les Epesses	Moulin du Puy du Fou	Moulin Tour		Moulins a Vent (in French)	
Les Essarts	Moulin de L'Ansonnière	Moulin Tour		Moulins a Vent (in French)	
Les Essarts	Moulin de la Coussaie	Moulin Tour		Moulins a Vent (in French)	
Les Essarts	Moulin de la Thibaudière	Moulin Tour		Moulins a Vent (in French)	
Les Herbiers	Moulin du Mont des Alouettes #1	Moulin Tour	16th century	Moulins a Vent (in French)	
Les Herbiers	Moulin du Mont des Alouettes #2	Moulin Tour	16th century	Moulins a Vent (in French)	
Les Herbiers	Moulin du Mont des Alouettes #3	Moulin Tour		Foundations only Moulins a Vent (in French)	
Les Herbiers	Moulin du Mont des Alouettes #4	Moulin Tour		Foundations only Moulins a Vent (in French)	
Les Lucs-sur-Boulogne	Moulin de la Martinière #1	Moulin Tour		Moulins a Vent (in French)	
Les Lucs-sur-Boulogne	Moulin de la Martinière #2	Moulin Tour		Moulins a Vent (in French)	
Les Lucs-sur-Boulogne	Le Moulin du Petit Luc	Moulin Tour		Moulins a Vent (in French)	
Les Lucs-sur-Boulogne	Moulin de Sainte Claire	Moulin Tour		Moulins a Vent (in French)	
L'Herbaudière	Moulin de l'Herbaudière #1	Moulin Tour		Moulins a Vent (in French)	
L'Herbaudière	Moulin de l'Herbaudière #2	Moulin Tour		Moulins a Vent (in French)	
L'Herbaudière	Moulin de Luzéronde	Moulin Tour		Moulins a Vent (in French)	
L'Herbaudière	Moulin de la Cogue	Moulin Tour		Moulins a Vent (in French)	
L'Île-d'Olonne	Moulin Gueffard	Moulin Tour		Moulins a Vent (in French)	
Longeville-sur-Mer	Moulin des Rabouillères; Moulin Bots Pias	Moulin Tour		Moulins a Vent (in French)	
Longeville-sur-Mer	Le Petit Moulin	Moulin Tour		Moulins a Vent (in French)	
Longeville-sur-Mer	Moulin de la Raisinière	Moulin Tour		Moulins a Vent (in French)	
Luçon	Moulin a Luçon	Moulin Tour en Bois		Moulins a Vent (in French)	
Maillé	Moulin de la Pichonnière	Moulin Tour		Moulins a Vent (in French)	
Mallièvre	Moulin Baubry	Moulin Tour			
Maillezais	Moulin La Sargente	Moulin Tour		Moulins a Vent (in French)	
Mareuil-sur-Lay-Dissais	Moulin Seigné	Moulin Tour		Ruin; Moulins a Vent (in French)	
Martinet	Moulin de Pontreau	Moulin Tour		Moulins a Vent (in French)	
Monsireigne	Moulin des Salinières	Moulin Tour		Moulins a Vent (in French)	
Mormaison	Moulin du Bois Jarry	Moulin Tour	1819	Moulins a Vent (in French)	
Mouchamps	Moulin des Plantes	Moulin Tour		Moulins a Vent (in French)	
Mouchamps	Vieux Moulin	Moulin Tour		Moulins a Vent (in French)	
Mouilleron-en-Pareds	Moulin de Lattre des Tassigny #1	Moulin Tour		Moulins a Vent (in French)	
Mouilleron-en-Pareds	Moulin de Lattre des Tassigny #2	Moulin Tour		Moulins a Vent (in French)	
Mouilleron-en-Pareds	Moulin de Lattre des Tassigny #3	Moulin Tour		Moulins a Vent (in French)	
Mouilleron-en-Pareds	Moulin de Lattre des Tassigny #4	Moulin Tour		Moulins a Vent (in French)	
Mouilleron-en-Pareds	Moulin de Lattre des Tassigny #5	Moulin Tour		Moulins a Vent (in French)	
Mouilleron-en-Pareds	Moulin de Lattre des Tassigny No. 6			Moulins a Vent (in French)	
Mouilleron-le-Captif	Moulin Roux	Moulin Tour		Moulins a Vent (in French)	
Nalliers	Moulin du Champ de la Truie	Moulin Tour	Late 19th century	Moulins a Vent (in French)	
Nalliers	Moulin de Naillers	Moulin Tour		Moulins a Vent (in French)	
Noirmoutier-en-l'Île	Moulin de la Lande	Moulin Tour		Moulins a Vent (in French)	
Notre-Dame-de-Monts	Moulin Jodet	Moulin Tour	c. 1835	Moulins a Vent (in French)	
Notre-Dame-de-Monts	Moulin du Bourg	Moulin Tour		Moulins a Vent (in French)	
Notre-Dame-de-Monts	Lr Grand Moulin; Moulin du Jardin du Vent	Moulin Tour	1776	Moulins a Vent (in French)	
Notre-Dame-de-Monts	Moulin de la Croix	Moulin Tour		Moulins a Vent (in French)	
Olonne-sur-Mer	Moulin des Roses	Moulin Tour		Moulins a Vent (in French)	
Oulmes	Moulin de Pacouinay	Moulin Tour		Moulins a Vent (in French)	
Port-Joinville	Moulin du Calvaire	Moulin Tour		Moulins a Vent (in French)	
Port-Joinville	Moulin du Grand Chemin	Moulin Tour		Moulins a Vent (in French)	
Port-Joinville	Moulin le Cassé; Gros Moulin	Moulin Tour		Moulins a Vent (in French)	
Port-Joinville	Moulin le Camp	Moulin Tour		Moulins a Vent (in French)	
Pouillé	Moulin de Pouillé	Moulin Tour		Moulins a Vent (in French)	
Pouzauges	Moulin de Terrie-Marteau #1	Moulin Tour	1830	Moulins a Vent (in French)	
Pouzauges	Moulin de Terrie-Marteau #2	Moulin Tour	1830	Moulins a Vent (in French)	
Puyravault	Moulin Galerne	Moulin Tour		Moulins a Vent (in French)	
Puyravault	Moulin de la Garne	Moulin Tour		Ruin; Moulins a Vent (in French)	
Rosnay	Moulin de Bellevue	Moulin Tour		Moulins a Vent (in French)	
Saint-Benoist-sur-Mer	Moulin Vieux	Moulin Tour		Moulins a Vent (in French)	
Saint-Cyr-des-Gâts	Moulin Martin	Moulin Tour	1885	Moulins a Vent (in French)	
Saint-Denis-la-Chevasse	Moulin des Jouineaux	Moulin Tour		Moulins a Vent (in French)	
Saint-Denis-la-Chavesse	Moulin des Jarries	Moulin Tour		Moulins a Vent (in French)	
Sainte-Cécile	Moulin Benet	Moulin Tour		Moulins a Vent (in French)	
Sainte-Cécile	Moulin des Roblinières	Moulin Tour		Moulins a Vent (in French)	
Sainte-Foy	Moulin de Baslière	Moulin Tour		Moulins a Vent (in French)	
Sainte-Radégonde-des-Noyers	Moulin Vieux	Moulin Tour		Moulins a Vent (in French)	
Saint-Étienne-du-Bois	Moulin des Emerillères	Moulin Tour		Moulins a Vent (in French)	
Saint-Georges-de-Pointindoux	Moulin des Moullières	Moulin Tour		Moulins a Vent (in French)	
Saint-Gervais	Moulin de Châtenay	Moulin Tour		Moulins a Vent (in French)	
Saint-Gervais	Moulin de la Rive	Moulin Tour	19th century	Moulins a Vent (in French)	
Saint-Gervais	Moulin de la Denisière	Moulin Tour		Moulins a Vent (in French)	
Saint-Gilles-Croix-de-Vie	Moulin du Fenouiller				
Saint-Hilaire-la-Forêt	Moulin de la Jollière	Moulin Tour		Moulins a Vent (in French)	
Saint-Jean-de-Monts	Moulin du Pré Dannion	Moulin Tour	19th century	Moulins a Vent (in French)	
Saint-Jean-de-Monts	Moulin des Rivières	Moulin Tour		Moulins a Vent (in French)	
Saint-Jean-de-Monts	Moulin de la Sablière	Moulin Tour		Moulins a Vent (in French)	
Saint-Jean-de-Monts	Moulin des Grenouillères	Moulin Tour		Moulins a Vent (in French)	
Saint-Jean-de-Monts	Moulin Cassé	Moulin Tour		Moulins a Vent (in French)	
Saint-Mars-des-Prés	Moulin de St Mars des Prés	Moulin Tour		Moulins a Vent (in French)	
Saint-Martin-des-Noyers	Moulin des Bois de la Cour #1	Moulin Tour		Moulins a Vent (in French)	
Saint-Martin-des-Noyers	Moulin de Villars	Moulin Tour		Moulins a Vent (in French)	
Saint-Martin-des-Noyers	Moulion des Bois de la Cour #2	Moulin Tour		Moulins a Vent (in French)	
Saint-Martin-des-Noyers	Moulion des Bois de la Cour #3	Moulin Tour		Moulins a Vent (in French)	
Saint-Martin-des-Noyers	Moulion des Bois de la Cour #4	Moulin Tour		Moulins a Vent (in French)	
Saint-Martin-des-Noyers	Moulin du Chêne Rond	Moulin Tour		Ruin; Moulins a Vent (in French)	
Saint-Mathurin	Moulin de St Mathurin	Moulin Tour	17th century	Moulins a Vent (in French)	
Saint-Maurice-le-Girard	Moulin de la Chaveche	Moulin Tour		Moulins a Vent (in French)	
Saint-Michel-en-l'Herm	Moulin du Rue de la Laiterie	Moulin Tour		Moulins a Vent (in French)	
Saint-Michel-en-l'Herm	Moulin du Rue des Moulins	Moulin Tour		Moulins a Vent (in French)	
Saint-Michel-Mont-Mercure	Moulin des Justices	Moulin Tour	19th century	Moulins a Vent (in French)	
Saint-Michel-Mont-Mercure	Moulin des Landes	Moulin Tour		Moulins a Vent (in French)	
Saint-Paul-en-Pareds	Moulin Vieux	Moulin Tour		Moulins a Vent (in French)	
Saint-Paul-en-Pareds	Moulin de l'Acheneau #1	Moulin Tour		Moulins a Vent (in French)	
Saint-Paul-en-Pareds	Moulin de l'Acheneau #2	Moulin Tour		Moulins a Vent (in French)	
Saint-Pierre-du-Chemin	Moulin a St Pierre du Chemin	Moulin Tour		Moulins a Vent (in French)	
Saint-Pierre-le-Vieux	Moulin a St Pierre le Vieux	Moulin Tour		Moulins a Vent (in French)	
Saint-Pierre-le-Vieux	Moulin de l'Ardellier	Moulin Tour		Moulins a Vent (in French)	
Saint-Pierre-le-Vieux	Moulin du Souil	Moulin Tour		Moulins a Vent (in French)	
Saint-Révérend	Moulin des Gourmands	Moulin Tour	1842	Moulins a Vent (in French)	
Saint-Sauveur	Moulin Maingourd	Moulin Tour		Moulins a Vent (in French)	
Saint Urbain	Moulin de la Bourrie; Moulin du Petit Morin	Moulin Tour		Moulins a Vent (in French)	
Saint-Urbain	Moulin du Poirot	Moulin Tour		Moulins a Vent (in French)	
Saint-Vincent-Sterlanges	Moulin de St Vincent Sterlanges #1	Moulin Tour		Moulins a Vent (in French)	
Saint-Vincent-Sterlanges	Moulin de St Vincent Sterlanges #2	Moulin Tour		Moulins a Vent (in French)	
Saint-Vincent-sur-Jard	Moulin du Bouil	Moulin Tour		Moulins a Vent (in French)	
Sallertaine	Moulin de Rairé	Moulin Tour	16th century	Moulins a Vent (in French)	
Sallertaine	Moulin de Mauny	Moulin Tour		Moulins a Vent (in French)	
Sallertaine	Moulin Arnaudeau	Moulin Tour			
Sérigné	Moulin des Poiteaux	Moulin Tour		Moulins a Vent (in French)	
Sérigné	Moulin de la Vigne	Moulin Tour		Moulins a Vent (in French)	
Sigournais	Moulin Chaigneau	Moulin Tour		Moulins a Vent (in French)	
Sigournais	Moulin de Sigournais	Moulin Tour		Moulins a Vent (in French)	
Soullans	Moulin de Touvent	Moulin Tour		Moulins a Vent (in French)	
Talmont-Saint-Hilaire	Moulin de Talmont St Hilaire	Moulin Tour		Moulins a Vent (in French)	
Talmont-Saint-Hilaire	Moulin des Hautes Mers	Moulin Tour		Moulins a Vent (in French)	
Talmont-Saint-Hilaire	Moulin du Querry Pigeon	Moulin Tour		Moulins a Vent (in French)	
Talmont-Saint-Hilaire	Moulin de la Cour	Moulin Tour		Moulins a Vent (in French)	
Talmont-Saint-Hilaire	Moulin Sorin	Moulin Tour		Moulins a Vent (in French)	
Tallud-Sainte-Gemme	Moulin du Rocher	Moulin Tour		Moulins a Vent (in French)	
Thorigny	Moulin Neuf	Moulin Tour		Moulins a Vent (in French)	
Thorigny	Moulin de Bel Air	Moulin Tour		Moulins a Vent (in French)	
Vairé	Moulin de la Flaivière	Moulin Tour		Moulins a Vent (in French)	
Vairé	Moulin des Chânières	Moulin Tour		Moulins a Vent (in French)	
Vairé	Moulin du Centre	Moulin Tour		Moulins a Vent (in French)	
Vairé	Moulin du Rétail	Moulin Tour		Moulins a Vent (in French)	
Venansault	Moulin des Fontenelles; Moulin de la Nicolière	Moulin Tour		Ruin; Moulins a Vent (in French)	
Vix	Moulin Rambaud	Moulin Tour		Moulins a Vent (in French)	
Xanton-Chassenon	Moulin a Xanton-Chassenon	Moulin Tour		Moulins a Vent (in French)	
