= Pierre Bersuire =

French author

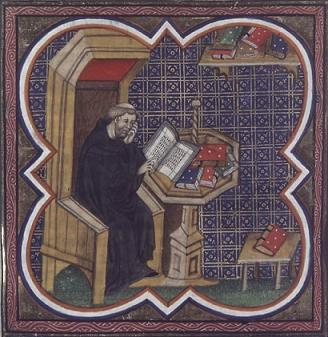
Detail of Pierre Bersuire at work, from his translation of Titus Livius, Ab urbe condita, fourteenth century

Pierre Bersuire (c. 1290–1362), also known as Pierre Bercheure and Pierre Berchoire (in Latin, Petrus Berchorius or Petrus Bercorius), was a French author of the Middle Ages. A Benedictine, he was a translator, encyclopaedist, and the author of several works, including the Ovidius Moralizatus (not to be confused with the Ovide moralisé) (1340), a work of mythography. The Gesta Romanorum, a Latin collection of anecdotes and tales, is sometimes attributed to him.

== Life ==
Born at Saint-Pierre-du-Chemin, in the area of Vendée in Poitou, he entered monastic orders in his youth rather than take a university degree. He first became a Franciscan but subsequently joined the Order of St. Benedict at Maillezais Abbey.

In 1320 he accompanied his abbot to Avignon, at the time the seat of the papacy. He remained in Avignon for 12 years as a protégé of the papal vice-chancellor Cardinal Pierre des Prés (Peter de Pratis), bishop of Praeneste. He steadily accumulated offices of various monasteries and priories (he was not required to reside at any of them). He met Petrarch at Avignon; both men mention the other in terms of high praise.

In the 1340s, Bersuire became a student at the University of Paris and met Petrarch there again. The Italian poet was on an embassy to the French court. In the 1350s, at the command of John II of France, Bersuire translated Petrarch's reassembly of Livy's Latin history of Rome, Ab urbe condita, into French.

Bersuire spent the last dozen years of his life as Prior of St. Eligius (Saint-Éloi) (from 1354), on the Île de la Cité, close to Notre-Dame.

== Works ==
Bersuire was an eloquent preacher and a voluminous homiletical writer. His most important work is the Repertorium morale, for the use of preachers, a kind of Biblico-moral dictionary, in which the principal words of Scripture are arranged alphabetically and moral reflections attached thereto. It appeared some time before 1355 and was dedicated to Cardinal de Pratis. The Repertorium proved to be one of the most popular books of its kind and was frequently printed first at Cologne in 1477, and again at Nuremberg (1489), Lyon (1517), Paris (1521), Venice (1589), Antwerp (1609), etc.

Other works by Bersuire include:

- Reductorium morale, a moralization of Bartholomeus Anglicus' encyclopedic work De proprietatibus rerum ("On the Nature of Things"), which provides the structure for the first 13 of its 16 books. (The first 14 books can be found in the Paris, 1521 edition.) Its last two books also circulated independently:
  - Book XV: Circulated by 1340 as Ovidius Moralizatus (not to be confused with the Ovide Moralisé). The book was a moralization of the work of the Roman poet Ovid, particularly his Metamorphoses. Bersuire's "moralization" of Ovid in turn influenced Geoffrey Chaucer, who drew on many of its stories for his Canterbury Tales.
  - Book XVI: Circulated as Reductorium morale super totam Bibliam (printed as Liber Bibliae moralis).
- Livre de Tytus Livius de hystoire roumaine, a French translation of the Roman historian Livy's Ab Urbe Condita, completed between 1354 and 1356 and dedicated to John II of France. The work was later translated directly into Spanish c. 1400 by Pero López de Ayala.
