= Sainte-Pexine =

- Commune
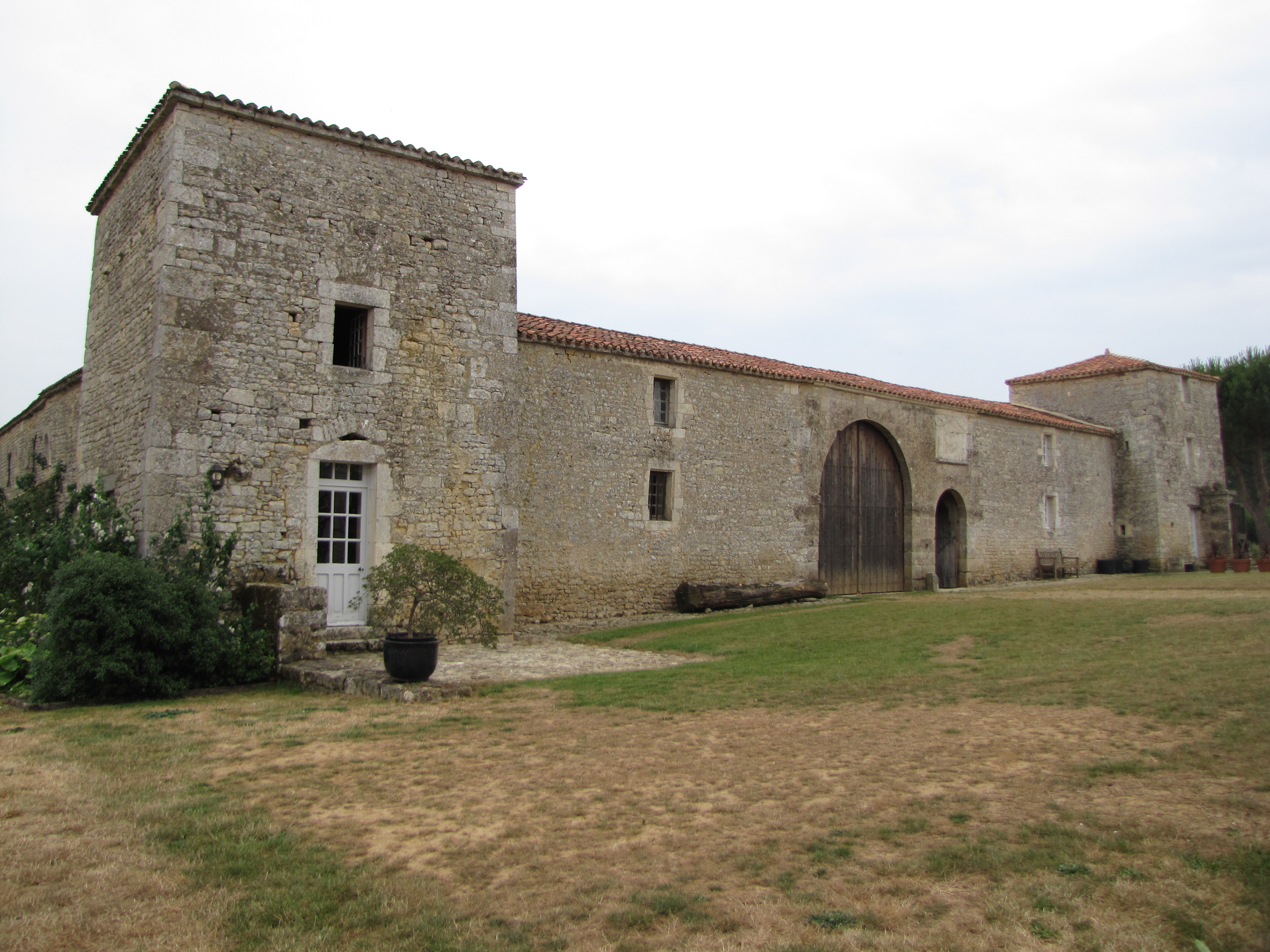
- Chaligny Manor

- Coat of arms
- Location of Sainte-Pexine
- Location within France Location within Pays de la Loire
- Coordinates: 46°33′43″N 1°08′17″W
- Country: France
- Region: Pays de la Loire
- Department: Vendée
- Arrondissement: Fontenay-le-Comte
- Canton: Mareuil-sur-Lay-Dissais

Government
  - Mayor (2020–2026): James Gandrieau
- Area^{1}: 15.76 km^{2} (6.08 sq mi)
- Highest elevation: 68 m (223 ft)
- Lowest elevation: 7 m (23 ft)
- Population (2023): 291
  - Density: 18.5/km^{2} (47.8/sq mi)
- Time zone: UTC+01:00 (CET)
  - Summer (DST): UTC+02:00 (CEST)
- INSEE/Postal code: 85261 /85320
- ^{1} French Land Register data, which excludes lakes, ponds, glaciers > 1 km^{2} (0.386 sq mi or 247 acres) and river estuaries.

Sainte-Pexine (French pronunciation: [sɛ̃t pɛksin]) is a commune in the Vendée department in the Pays de la Loire region in western France.

== Geography ==
The river Lay flows southwestward through the northern part of the commune and forms part of its western border; the river Smagne, a tributary of the Lay, forms most of the commune's southern border.

== See also ==
- Communes of the Vendée department
