= Saint-Cyr-en-Talmondais =

- Commune
- Coat of arms
- Location of Saint-Cyr-en-Talmondais
- Location within France Location within Pays de la Loire
- Coordinates: 46°27′41″N 1°20′08″W
- Country: France
- Region: Pays de la Loire
- Department: Vendée
- Arrondissement: Les Sables-d'Olonne
- Canton: Mareuil-sur-Lay-Dissais

Government
  - Mayor (2020–2026): Nicolas Passchier
- Area^{1}: 13.91 km^{2} (5.37 sq mi)
- Highest elevation: 35 m (115 ft)
- Lowest elevation: 0 m (0 ft)
- Population (2023): 403
  - Density: 29.0/km^{2} (75.0/sq mi)
- Time zone: UTC+01:00 (CET)
  - Summer (DST): UTC+02:00 (CEST)
- INSEE/Postal code: 85206 /85540
- ^{1} French Land Register data, which excludes lakes, ponds, glaciers > 1 km^{2} (0.386 sq mi or 247 acres) and river estuaries.

Saint-Cyr-en-Talmondais is a commune in the Vendée department in the Pays de la Loire region in western France.

== Geography ==
The river Lay forms part of the commune's eastern border.

== See also ==
- Communes of the Vendée department
