= Moutiers-les-Mauxfaits =

- Commune
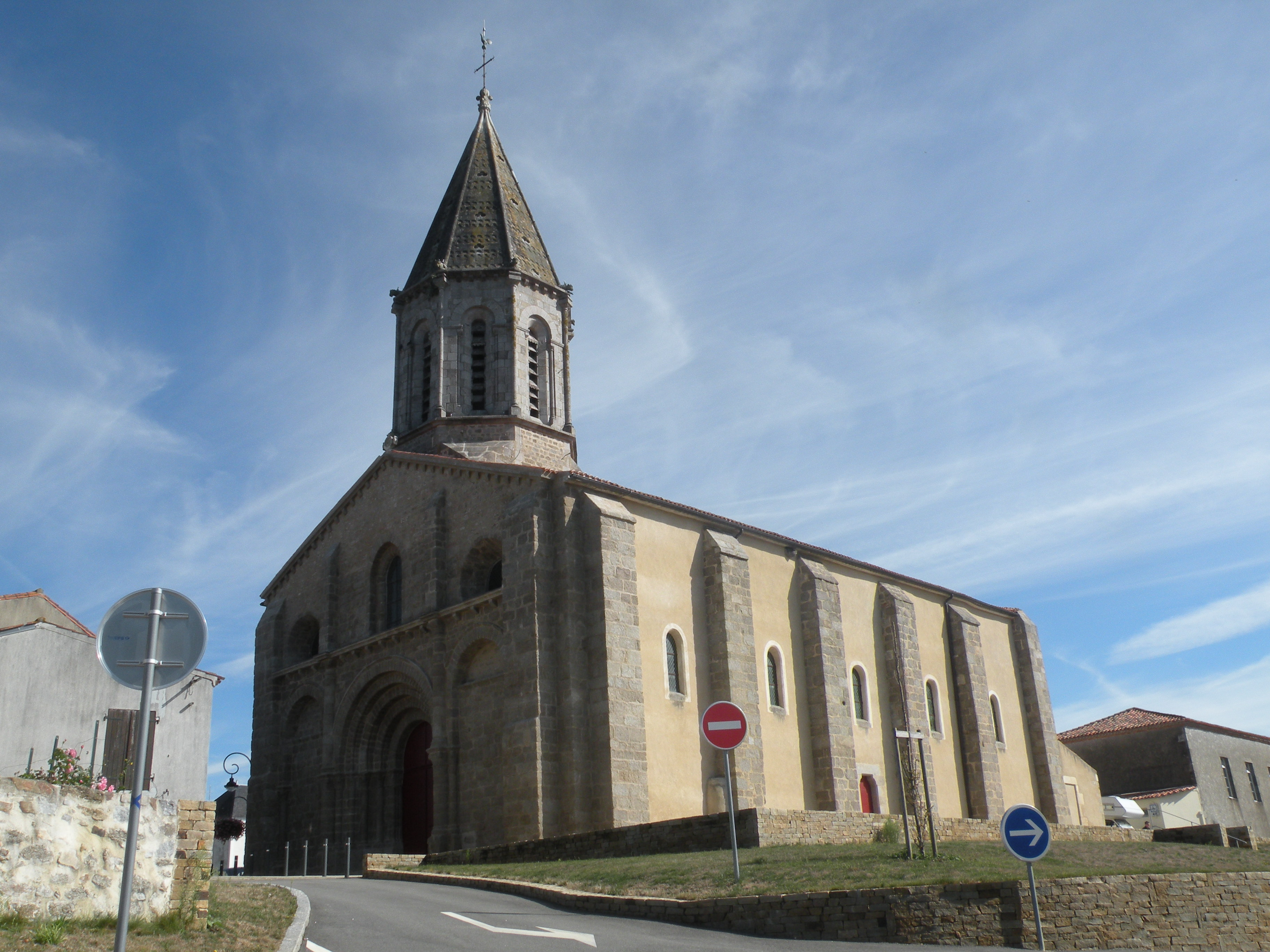
- The church of Saint-Jacques, in Moutiers-les-Mauxfaits

- Coat of arms
- Location of Moutiers-les-Mauxfaits
- Location within France Location within Pays de la Loire
- Coordinates: 46°29′32″N 1°25′32″W
- Country: France
- Region: Pays de la Loire
- Department: Vendée
- Arrondissement: Les Sables-d'Olonne
- Canton: Mareuil-sur-Lay-Dissais
- Intercommunality: Vendée Grand Littoral

Government
  - Mayor (2020–2026): Christian Aimé
- Area^{1}: 9.23 km^{2} (3.56 sq mi)
- Highest elevation: 71 m (233 ft)
- Lowest elevation: 17 m (56 ft)
- Population (2023): 2,385
  - Density: 258/km^{2} (669/sq mi)
- Time zone: UTC+01:00 (CET)
  - Summer (DST): UTC+02:00 (CEST)
- INSEE/Postal code: 85156 /85540
- ^{1} French Land Register data, which excludes lakes, ponds, glaciers > 1 km^{2} (0.386 sq mi or 247 acres) and river estuaries.

Moutiers-les-Mauxfaits (French pronunciation: [mutje le mofɛ]) is a commune in the Vendée department in the Pays de la Loire region in western France.

== Population ==
Historical population
Year	Pop.	±% p.a.
1968	1,003	—
1975	1,261	+3.32%
1982	1,259	−0.02%
1990	1,348	+0.86%
1999	1,419	+0.57%
2007	1,676	+2.10%
2012	1,991	+3.50%
2017	2,128	+1.34%
2023	2,385	+1.92%
Source: INSEE

== See also ==
- Communes of the Vendée department
