= Saint-Vincent-sur-Graon =

- Commune
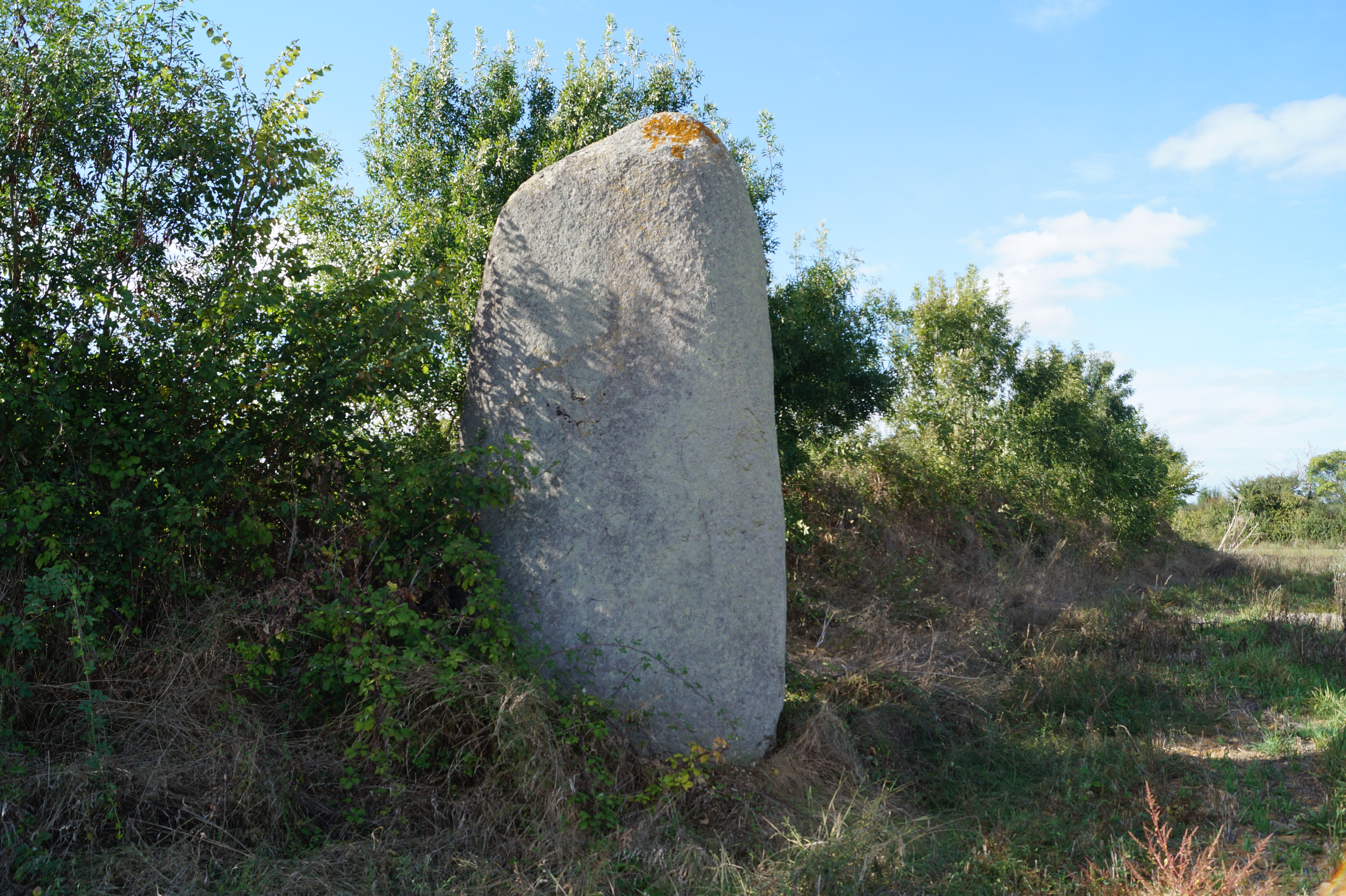
- The Menhir de la Chenillée in Saint-Vincent-sur-Graon

- Coat of arms
- Location of Saint-Vincent-sur-Graon
- Location within France Location within Pays de la Loire
- Coordinates: 46°31′05″N 1°23′17″W
- Country: France
- Region: Pays de la Loire
- Department: Vendée
- Arrondissement: Les Sables-d'Olonne
- Canton: Mareuil-sur-Lay-Dissais
- Intercommunality: Vendée-Grand-Littoral

Government
  - Mayor (2020–2026): Jannick Rabillé
- Area^{1}: 48.79 km^{2} (18.84 sq mi)
- Highest elevation: 79 m (259 ft)
- Lowest elevation: 0 m (0 ft)
- Population (2023): 1,615
  - Density: 33.10/km^{2} (85.73/sq mi)
- Time zone: UTC+01:00 (CET)
  - Summer (DST): UTC+02:00 (CEST)
- INSEE/Postal code: 85277 /85540
- ^{1} French Land Register data, which excludes lakes, ponds, glaciers > 1 km^{2} (0.386 sq mi or 247 acres) and river estuaries.

Saint-Vincent-sur-Graon is a commune in the Vendée department in the Pays de la Loire region in western France.

== Geography ==
The river Lay forms part of the commune's south-eastern border.

== See also ==
- Communes of the Vendée department
