= Auzay =

- Part of Auchay-sur-Vendée
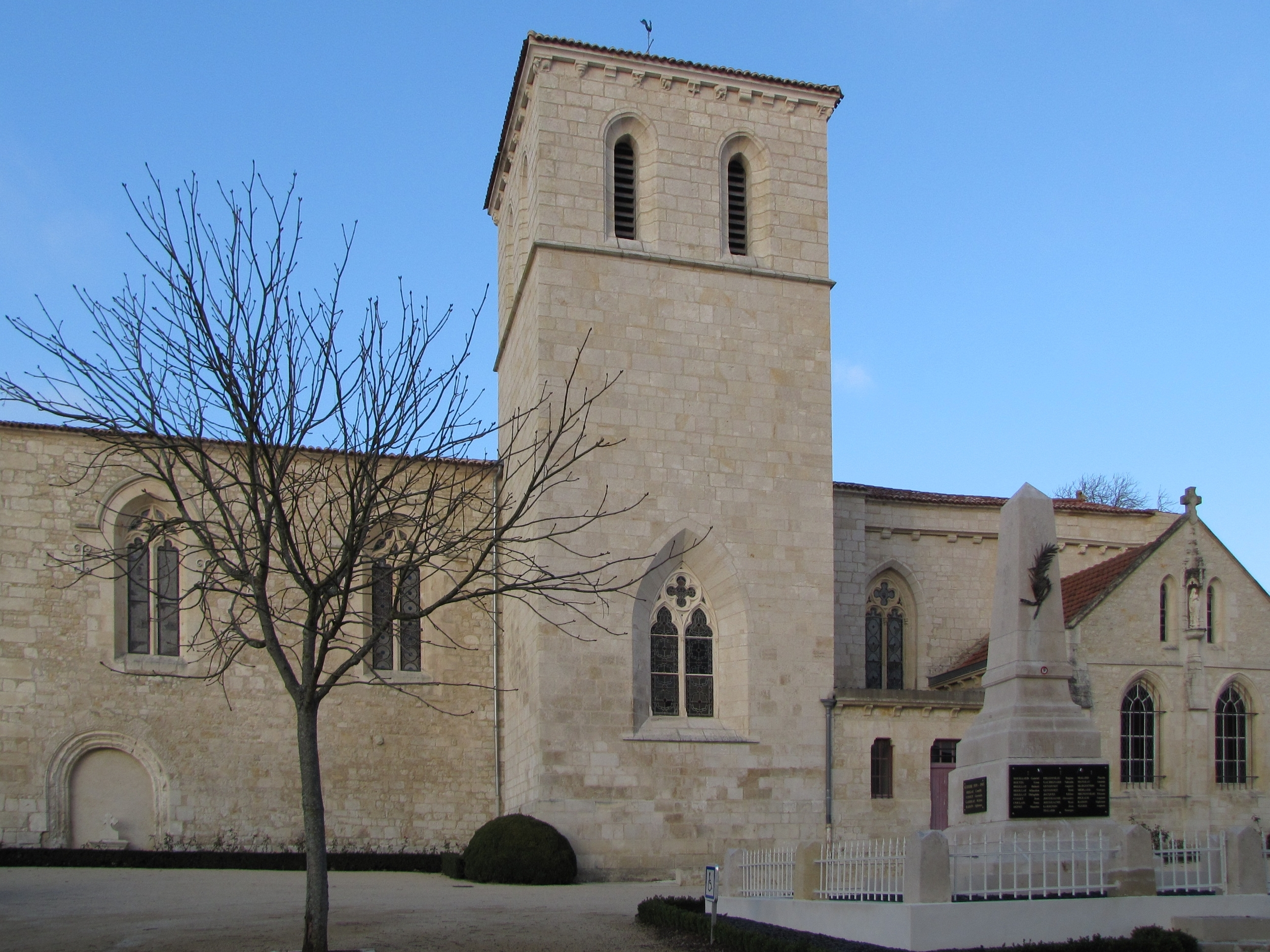
- The Priory of Auzay
- Location of Auzay
- Location within France Location within Pays de la Loire
- Coordinates: 46°26′31″N 0°51′54″W
- Country: France
- Region: Pays de la Loire
- Department: Vendée
- Arrondissement: Fontenay-le-Comte
- Canton: Fontenay-le-Comte
- Commune: Auchay-sur-Vendée
- Area^{1}: 13.79 km^{2} (5.32 sq mi)
- Elevation: 50 m (160 ft)
- Highest elevation: 52 m (171 ft)
- Lowest elevation: 1 m (3.3 ft)
- Population (2022): 643
  - Density: 46.6/km^{2} (121/sq mi)
- Time zone: UTC+01:00 (CET)
  - Summer (DST): UTC+02:00 (CEST)
- Postal code: 85200
- ^{1} French Land Register data, which excludes lakes, ponds, glaciers > 1 km^{2} (0.386 sq mi or 247 acres) and river estuaries.

Auzay (French pronunciation: [ozɛ]) is a former commune in the Vendée department in the Pays de la Loire region in western France. On 1 January 2017, it was merged into the new commune Auchay-sur-Vendée.

== See also ==
- Communes of the Vendée department
