= La Bretonnière-la-Claye =

- Commune
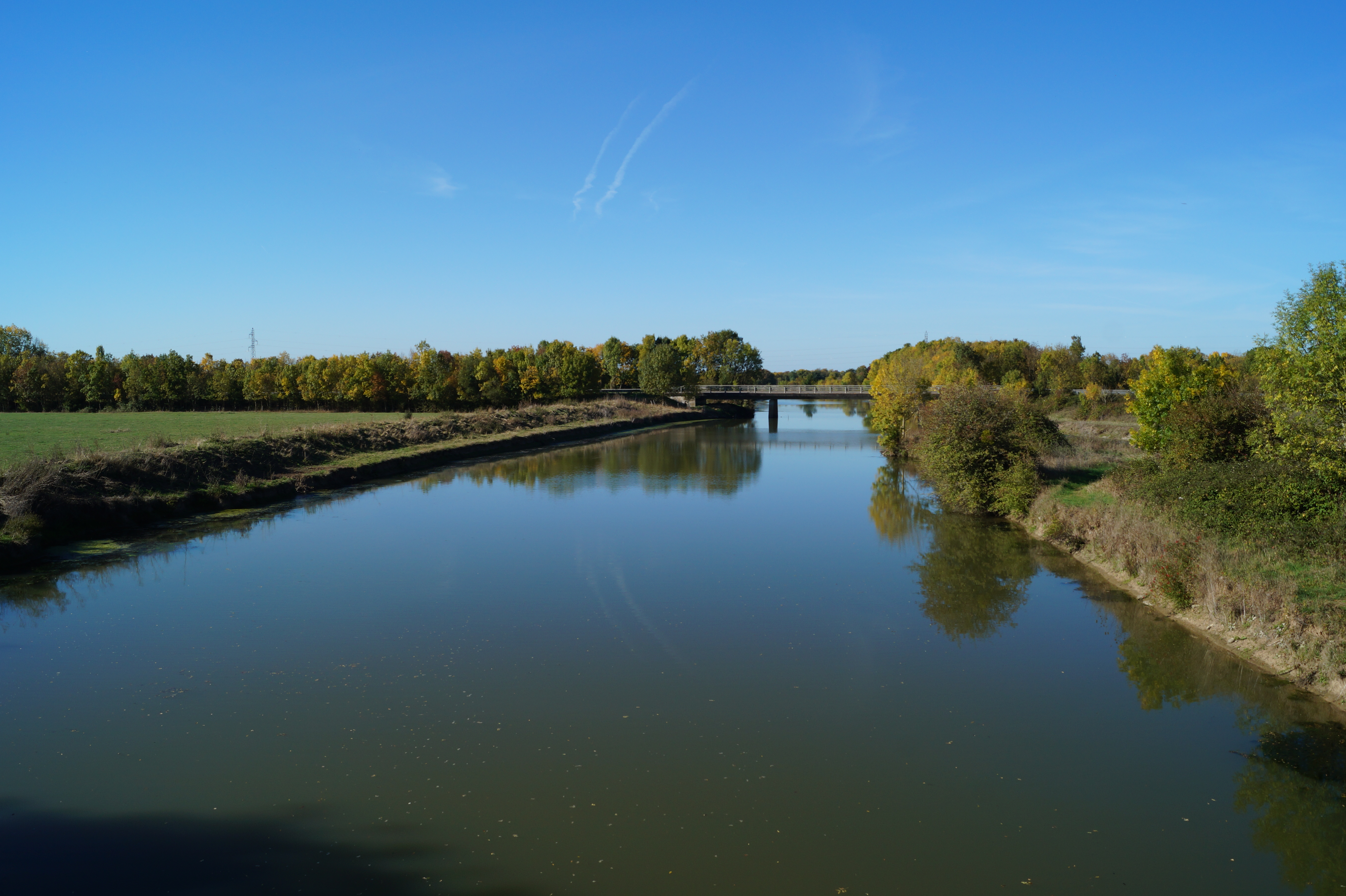
- Location of La Bretonnière-la-Claye
- Location within France Location within Pays de la Loire
- Coordinates: 46°29′02″N 1°15′18″W
- Country: France
- Region: Pays de la Loire
- Department: Vendée
- Arrondissement: Fontenay-le-Comte
- Canton: Mareuil-sur-Lay-Dissais
- Intercommunality: Sud Vendée Littoral

Government
  - Mayor (2020–2026): David Marchegay
- Area^{1}: 16.48 km^{2} (6.36 sq mi)
- Population (2023): 586
  - Density: 35.6/km^{2} (92.1/sq mi)
- Time zone: UTC+01:00 (CET)
  - Summer (DST): UTC+02:00 (CEST)
- INSEE/Postal code: 85036 /85320
- ^{1} French Land Register data, which excludes lakes, ponds, glaciers > 1 km^{2} (0.386 sq mi or 247 acres) and river estuaries.

La Bretonnière-la-Claye (French pronunciation: [la bʁətɔnjɛʁ la klɛ]) is a commune in the Vendée department in the Pays de la Loire region in western France.

== Geography ==
The river Lay forms all of the commune's western border.

== See also ==
- Communes of the Vendée department
