= Menomblet =

- Commune
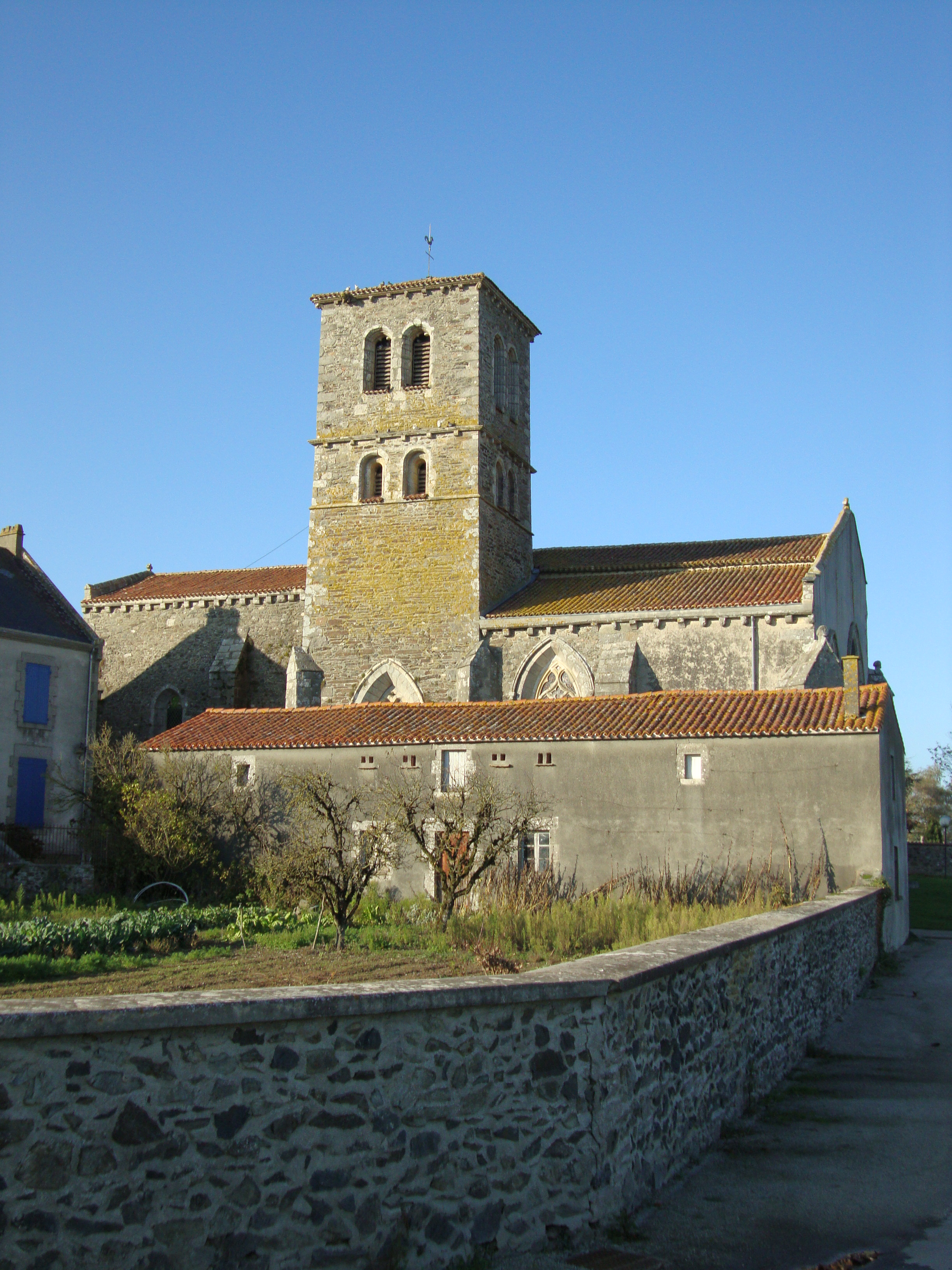
- The church of Our Lady of the Assumption, in Menomblet
- Location of Menomblet
- Location within France Location within Pays de la Loire
- Coordinates: 46°43′57″N 0°42′38″W
- Country: France
- Region: Pays de la Loire
- Department: Vendée
- Arrondissement: Fontenay-le-Comte
- Canton: La Châtaigneraie
- Intercommunality: Pays de la Châtaigneraie

Government
  - Mayor (2020–2026): Jean-Pierre Marquis
- Area^{1}: 20.95 km^{2} (8.09 sq mi)
- Highest elevation: 215 m (705 ft)
- Lowest elevation: 127 m (417 ft)
- Population (2023): 685
  - Density: 32.7/km^{2} (84.7/sq mi)
- Time zone: UTC+01:00 (CET)
  - Summer (DST): UTC+02:00 (CEST)
- INSEE/Postal code: 85141 /85700
- ^{1} French Land Register data, which excludes lakes, ponds, glaciers > 1 km^{2} (0.386 sq mi or 247 acres) and river estuaries.

Menomblet (French pronunciation: [mənɔ̃blɛ]) is a commune in the Vendée department in the Pays de la Loire, a western region of France.

== Geography ==
The river Lay forms most of the commune's southern border.

== See also ==
- Communes of the Vendée department
