= Moutiers-sur-le-Lay =

- Commune
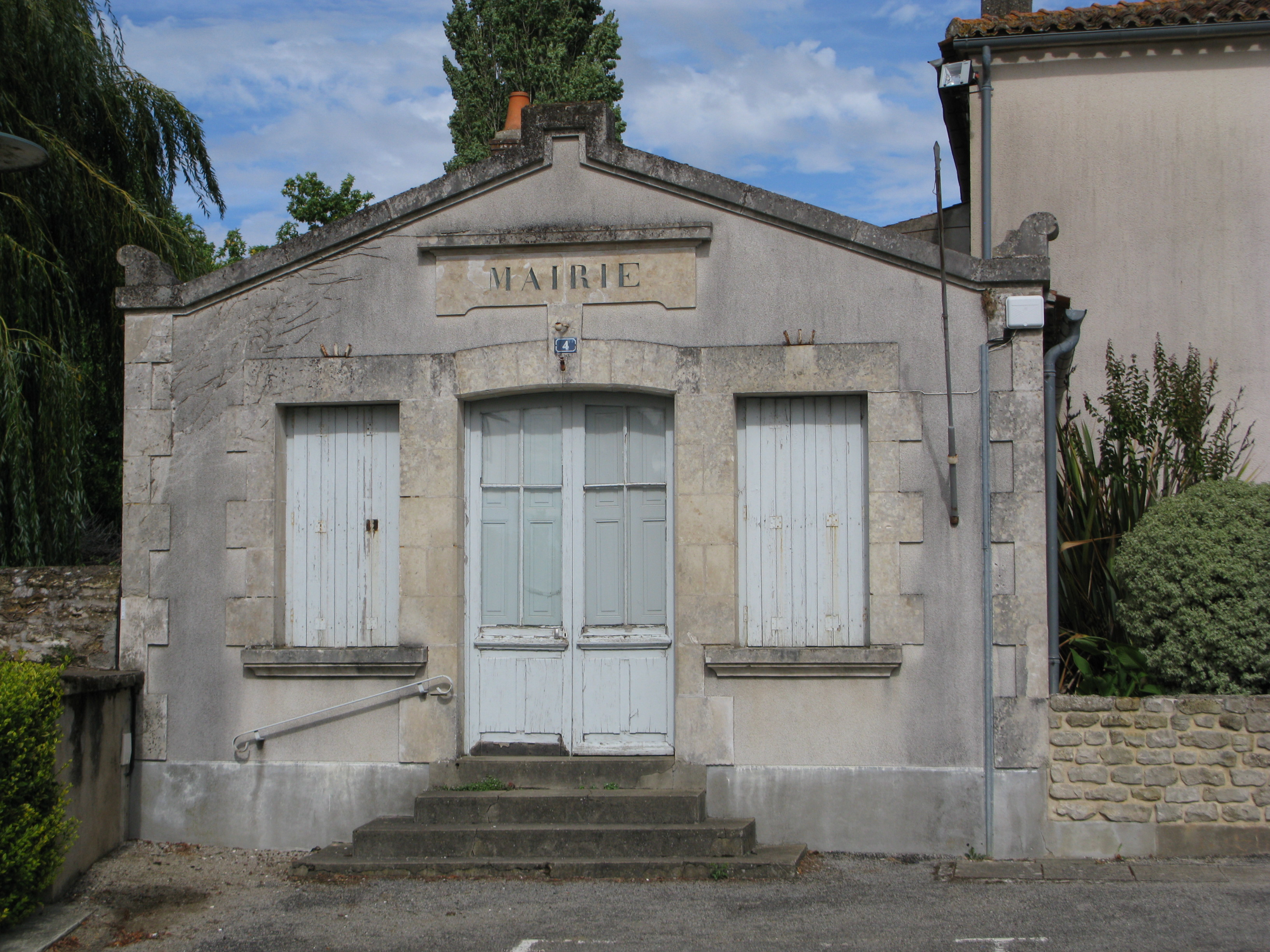
- The old town hall in Moutiers-sur-le-Lay
- Location of Moutiers-sur-le-Lay
- Location within France Location within Pays de la Loire
- Coordinates: 46°33′19″N 1°09′24″W
- Country: France
- Region: Pays de la Loire
- Department: Vendée
- Arrondissement: Fontenay-le-Comte
- Canton: Mareuil-sur-Lay-Dissais

Government
  - Mayor (2025–2026): Didier Forgerit
- Area^{1}: 18.28 km^{2} (7.06 sq mi)
- Highest elevation: 57 m (187 ft)
- Lowest elevation: 7 m (23 ft)
- Population (2023): 843
  - Density: 46.1/km^{2} (119/sq mi)
- Time zone: UTC+01:00 (CET)
  - Summer (DST): UTC+02:00 (CEST)
- INSEE/Postal code: 85157 /85320
- ^{1} French Land Register data, which excludes lakes, ponds, glaciers > 1 km^{2} (0.386 sq mi or 247 acres) and river estuaries.

Moutiers-sur-le-Lay (French pronunciation: [mutje syʁ lə lɛ], literally Moutiers on the Lay) is a commune in the Vendée department in the Pays de la Loire region in western France.

== Geography ==
The village lies on the left bank of the river Lay, which flows southwestward through the southern part of the commune.

== Local people ==
- Fr. Jean-Pierre Aulneau (1705-1736) a Roman Catholic priest of the Society of Jesus who died while serving as a missionary to the First Nations peoples of New France. Fr. Aulneau, who was born in Moutiers and from the local French nobility, was dubbed Minnesota's Forgotten Martyr" in 1961.

== See also ==
- Communes of the Vendée department
