= Canton of Mareuil-sur-Lay-Dissais =

Coordinates: 46.54°N 1.22°W

The canton of Mareuil-sur-Lay-Dissais is an administrative division of the Vendée department, western France. Its borders were modified at the French canton reorganisation which came into effect in March 2015. Its seat is in Mareuil-sur-Lay-Dissais.

It consists of the following communes:

1. L'Aiguillon-sur-Mer
2. Angles
3. Bessay
4. La Boissière-des-Landes
5. La Bretonnière-la-Claye
6. Le Champ-Saint-Père
7. Château-Guibert
8. Corpe
9. La Couture
10. Curzon
11. La Faute-sur-Mer
12. Le Givre
13. La Jonchère
14. Mareuil-sur-Lay-Dissais
15. Moutiers-les-Mauxfaits
16. Moutiers-sur-le-Lay
17. Péault
18. Les Pineaux
19. Rives-de-l'Yon
20. Rosnay
21. Saint-Avaugourd-des-Landes
22. Saint-Benoist-sur-Mer
23. Saint-Cyr-en-Talmondais
24. Sainte-Pexine
25. Saint-Vincent-sur-Graon
26. Le Tablier
27. La Tranche-sur-Mer
