= Yon (river) =

River in western France

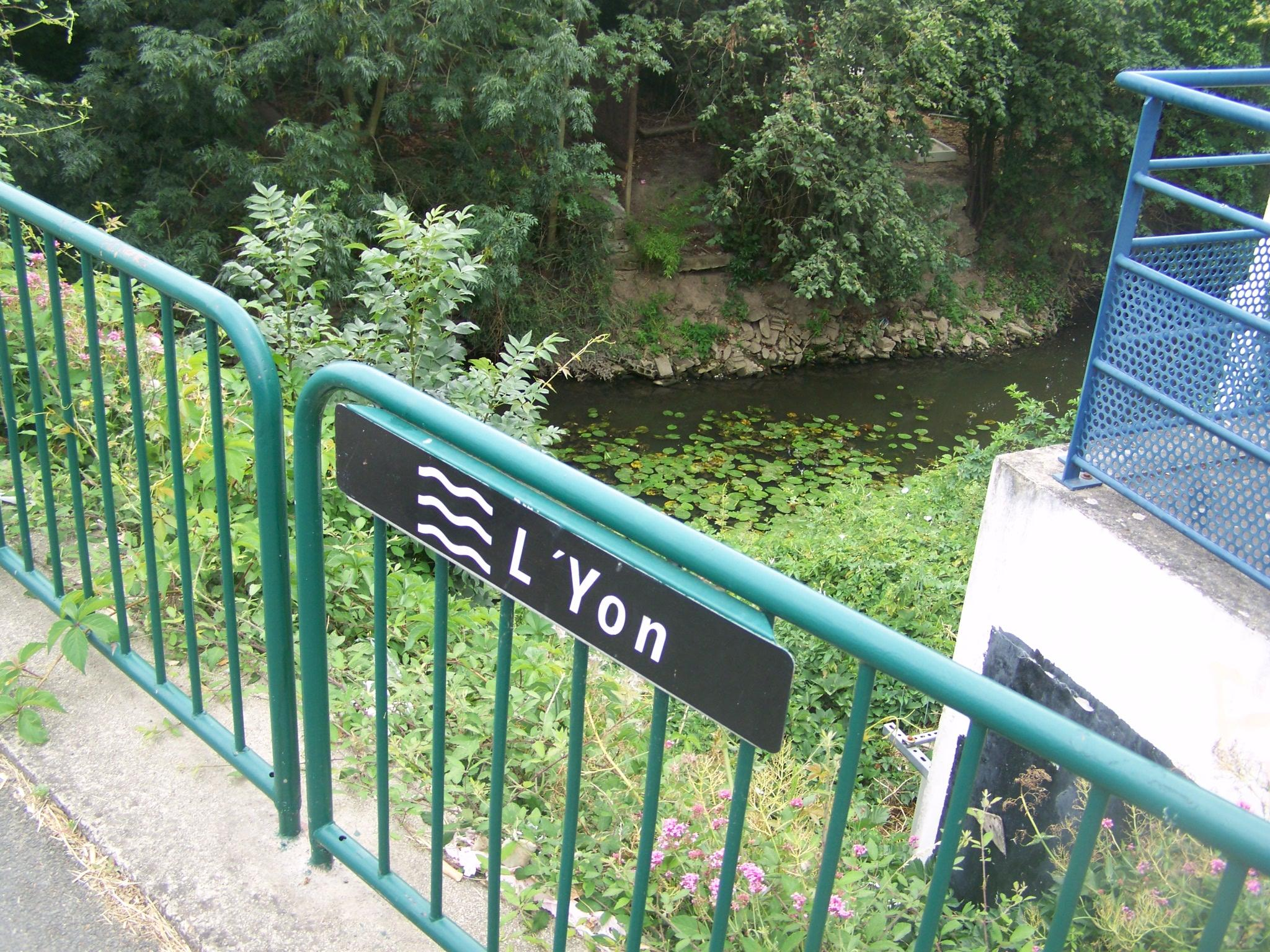

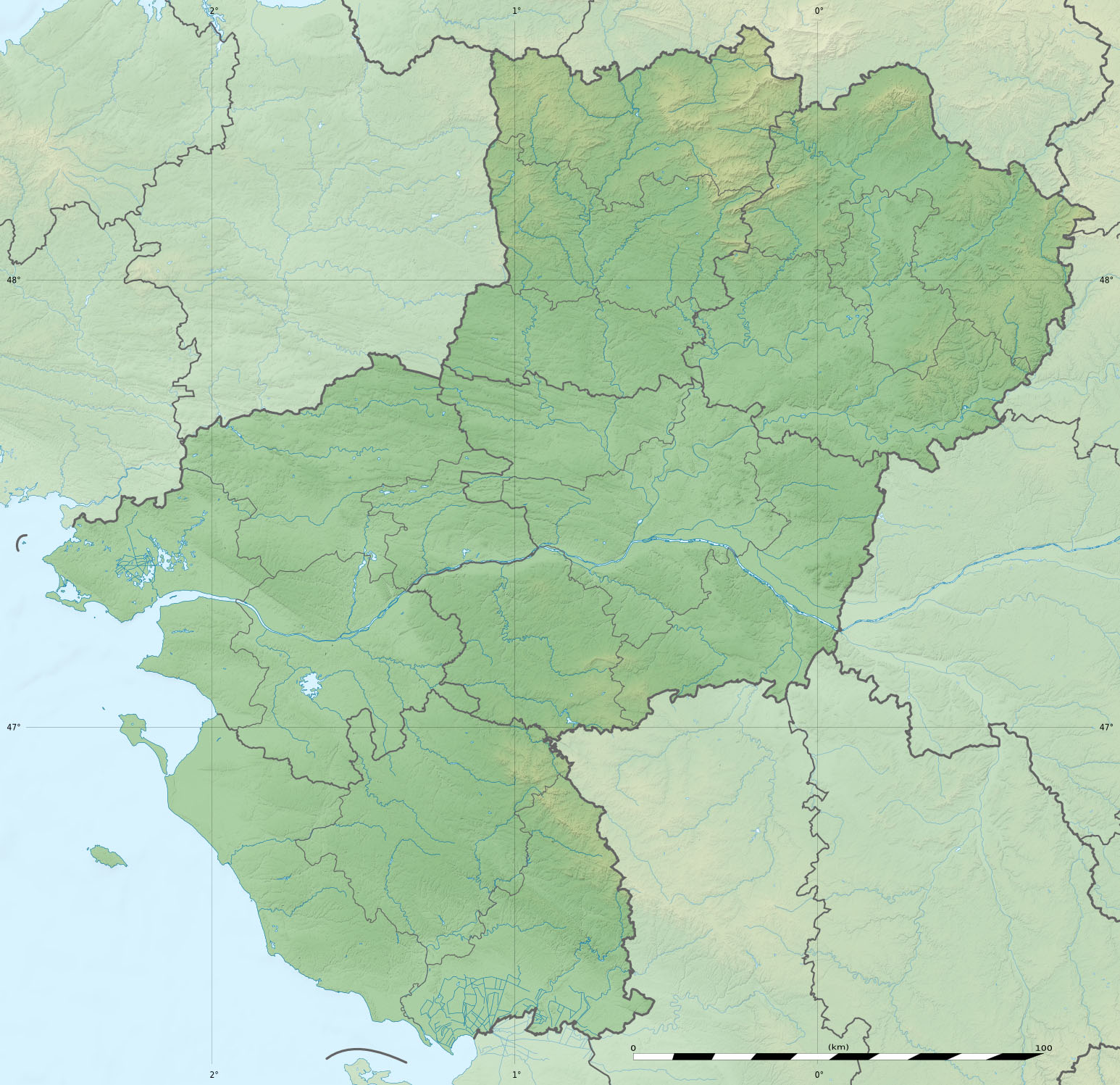
- Location within France Location within Pays de la Loire

Location
- Country: France

Physical characteristics
- Source
  - location: Saint-Martin-des-Noyers
  - coordinates: 46°42′59″N 01°15′10″W
  - elevation: 100 m (330 ft)
- Mouth
  - location: Lay
  - coordinates: 46°30′24″N 01°17′28″W
  - elevation: 5 m (16 ft)
- Length: 55.6 km (34.5 mi)
- Discharge
  - average: 8 m^{3}/s (280 cu ft/s)

Basin features
- Progression: Lay→ Bay of Biscay

The Yon (French pronunciation: [jɔ̃]) is a 55.6 km (34.5 mi) long river in the Vendée département, western France. Its source is at Saint-Martin-des-Noyers. It flows generally south. It is a right tributary of the Lay into which it flows between Rosnay and Le Champ-Saint-Père.

== Communes along its course ==
This list is ordered from source to mouth:

- Vendée: Saint-Martin-des-Noyers, La Chaize-le-Vicomte, La Ferrière, Dompierre-sur-Yon, La Roche-sur-Yon, Nesmy, Saint-Florent-des-Bois, Chaillé-sous-les-Ormeaux, Le Tablier, Rosnay, Le Champ-Saint-Père
