= Auchay-sur-Vendée =

- Commune
- Location of Auchay-sur-Vendée
- Location within France Location within Pays de la Loire
- Coordinates: 46°26′35″N 0°51′54″W
- Country: France
- Region: Pays de la Loire
- Department: Vendée
- Arrondissement: Fontenay-le-Comte
- Canton: Fontenay-le-Comte
- Intercommunality: Pays-de-Fontenay-Vendée

Government
  - Mayor (2020–2026): Dominique Gatineau
- Area^{1}: 21.16 km^{2} (8.17 sq mi)
- Population (2023): 1,122
  - Density: 53.02/km^{2} (137.3/sq mi)
- Time zone: UTC+01:00 (CET)
  - Summer (DST): UTC+02:00 (CEST)
- INSEE/Postal code: 85009 /85200
- ^{1} French Land Register data, which excludes lakes, ponds, glaciers > 1 km^{2} (0.386 sq mi or 247 acres) and river estuaries.

Auchay-sur-Vendée (French pronunciation: [oʃɛ syʁ vɑ̃de], literally Auchay on Vendée) is a commune in the department of Vendée, western France. The municipality was established on 1 January 2017 by merger of the former communes of Auzay (the seat) and Chaix.

== See also ==
- Communes of the Vendée department
