= Lay (river) =

River in western France

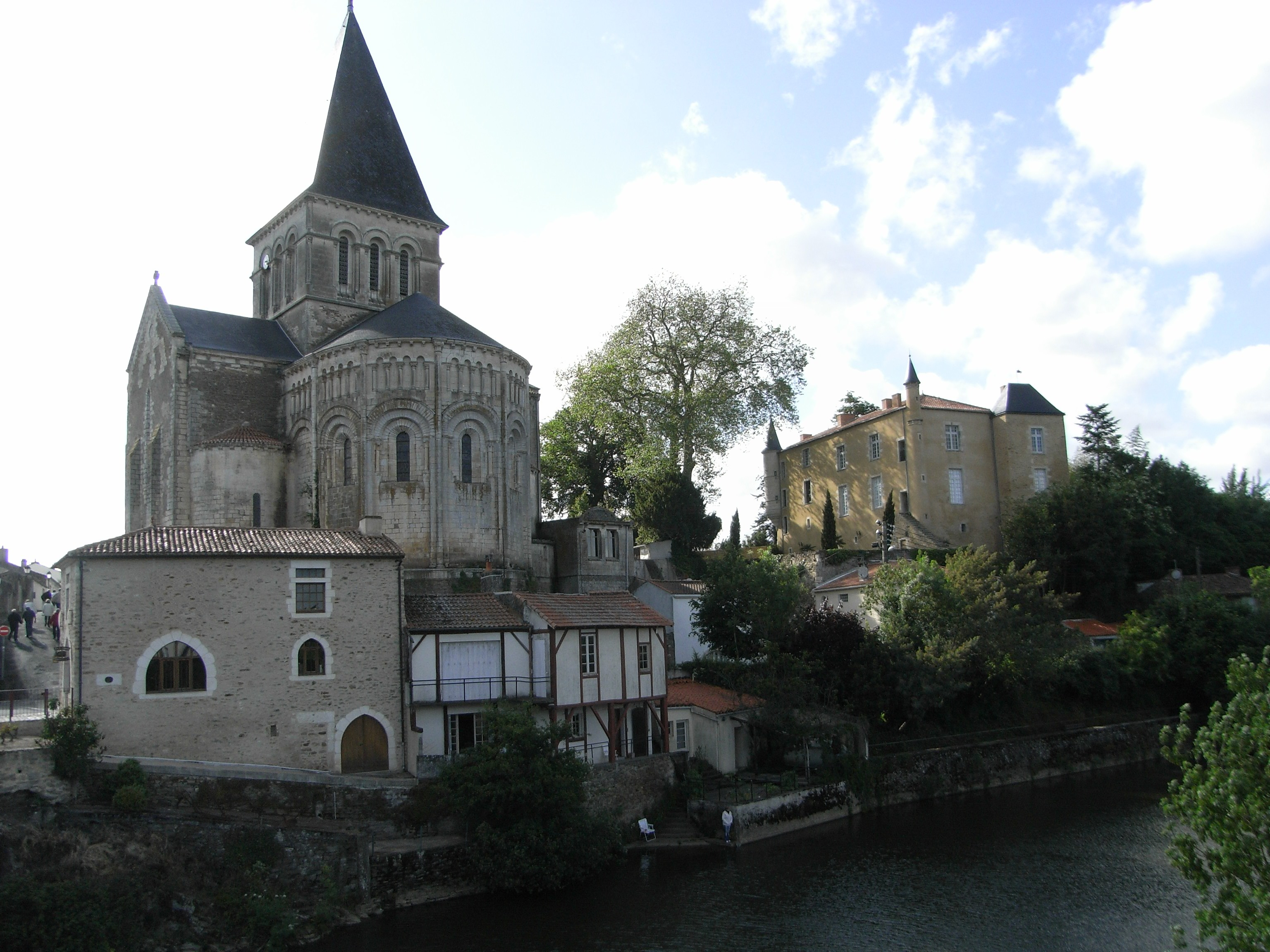
- The Lay at Mareuil-sur-Lay-Dissais

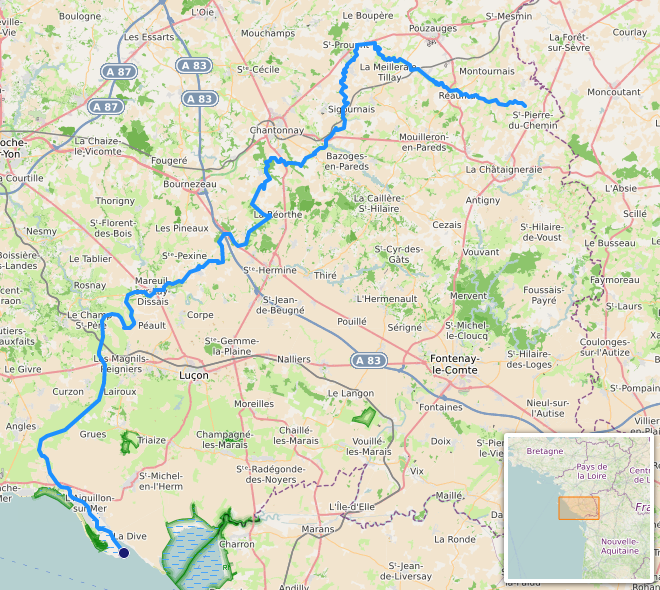
- Native name: Le Lay (French)

Location
- Country: France

Physical characteristics
- Source
  - location: Saint-Pierre-du-Chemin
  - coordinates: 46°42′34″N 00°42′37″W
  - elevation: 195 m (640 ft)
- Mouth
  - location: Bay of Biscay
  - coordinates: 46°19′14″N 01°18′10″W
  - elevation: 0 m (0 ft)
- Length: 120 km (75 mi)
- Basin size: 1,750 km^{2} (680 sq mi)
- Discharge
  - average: 14 m^{3}/s (490 cu ft/s)

The Lay (French pronunciation: [lɛ]) is a 120-kilometre (75 mi) river in the Vendée département, western France. Its source is at Saint-Pierre-du-Chemin and it flows generally southwest. It flows into the Bay of Biscay between La Faute-sur-Mer and L'Aiguillon-sur-Mer, 20 km (12 mi) northwest of La Rochelle.

Its main tributaries are the Yon and the Smagne.

== Communes along its course ==
This list is ordered from source to mouth:

- Vendée: Saint-Pierre-du-Chemin, Menomblet, Réaumur, Montournais, La Meilleraie-Tillay, Pouzauges, Le Boupère, Monsireigne, Saint-Prouant, Sigournais, Bazoges-en-Pareds, Chantonnay, La Réorthe, Bournezeau, Sainte-Hermine, Sainte-Pexine, Moutiers-sur-le-Lay, Bessay, Mareuil-sur-Lay-Dissais, La Couture, Péault, La Bretonnière-la-Claye, Rosnay, Le Champ-Saint-Père, Saint-Vincent-sur-Graon, Saint-Cyr-en-Talmondais, Curzon, Lairoux, Saint-Benoist-sur-Mer, Grues, Angles, La Faute-sur-Mer, L'Aiguillon-sur-Mer,
