= Le Tablier =

- Commune
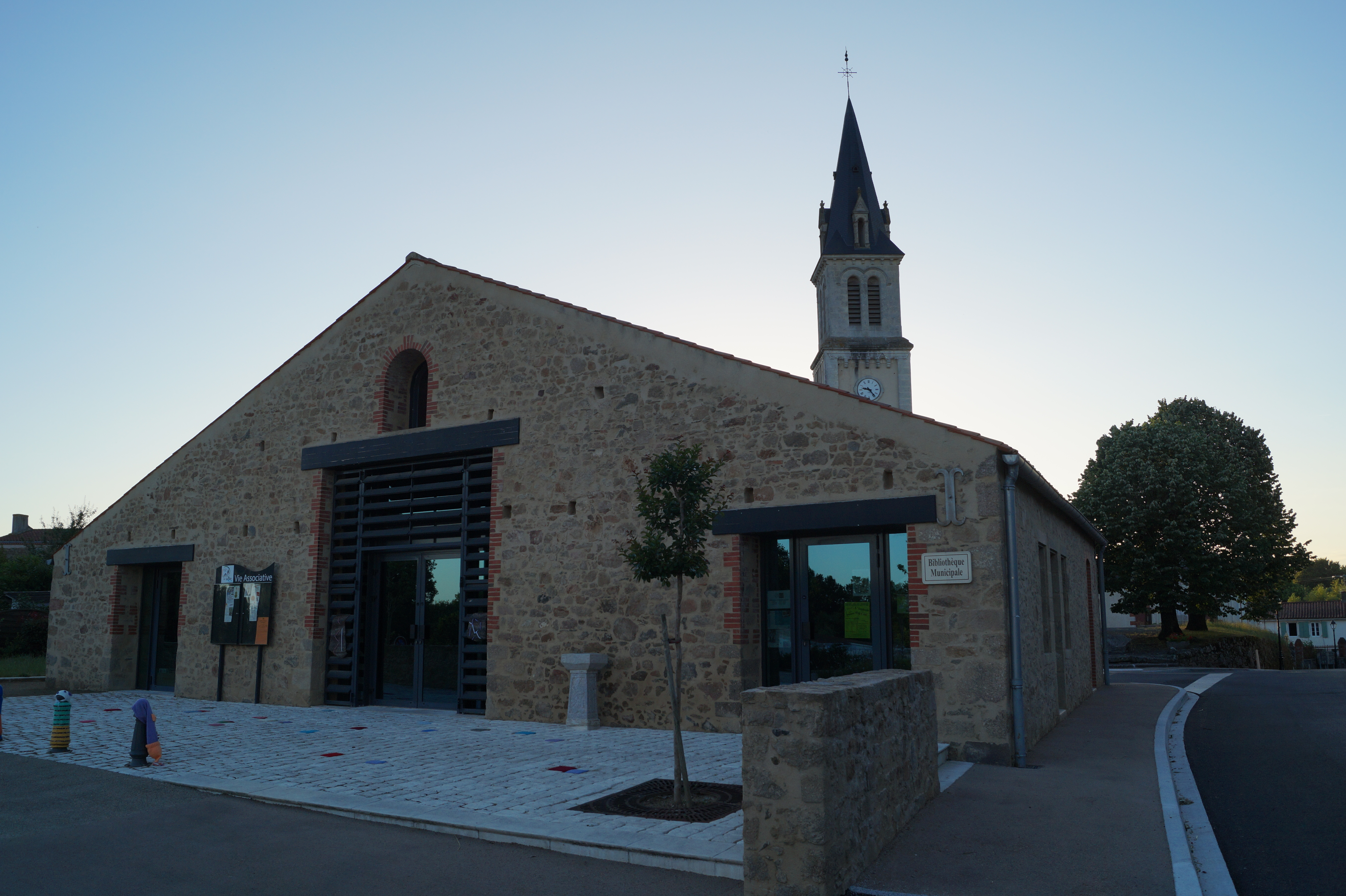
- Location of Le Tablier
- Location within France Location within Pays de la Loire
- Coordinates: 46°34′32″N 1°20′32″W
- Country: France
- Region: Pays de la Loire
- Department: Vendée
- Arrondissement: La Roche-sur-Yon
- Canton: Mareuil-sur-Lay-Dissais
- Intercommunality: La Roche-sur-Yon Agglomération

Government
  - Mayor (2023–2026): Annabelle Pilleniere
- Area^{1}: 9.28 km^{2} (3.58 sq mi)
- Highest elevation: 81 m (266 ft)
- Lowest elevation: 7 m (23 ft)
- Population (2023): 765
  - Density: 82.4/km^{2} (214/sq mi)
- Time zone: UTC+01:00 (CET)
  - Summer (DST): UTC+02:00 (CEST)
- INSEE/Postal code: 85285 /85310
- ^{1} French Land Register data, which excludes lakes, ponds, glaciers > 1 km^{2} (0.386 sq mi or 247 acres) and river estuaries.

Le Tablier (French pronunciation: [lə tablije]) is a commune in the Vendée department in the Pays de la Loire region in western France.

== Geography ==
The river Yon forms most of the commune's western border.

== See also ==
- Communes of the Vendée department
