= Bessay =

- Commune
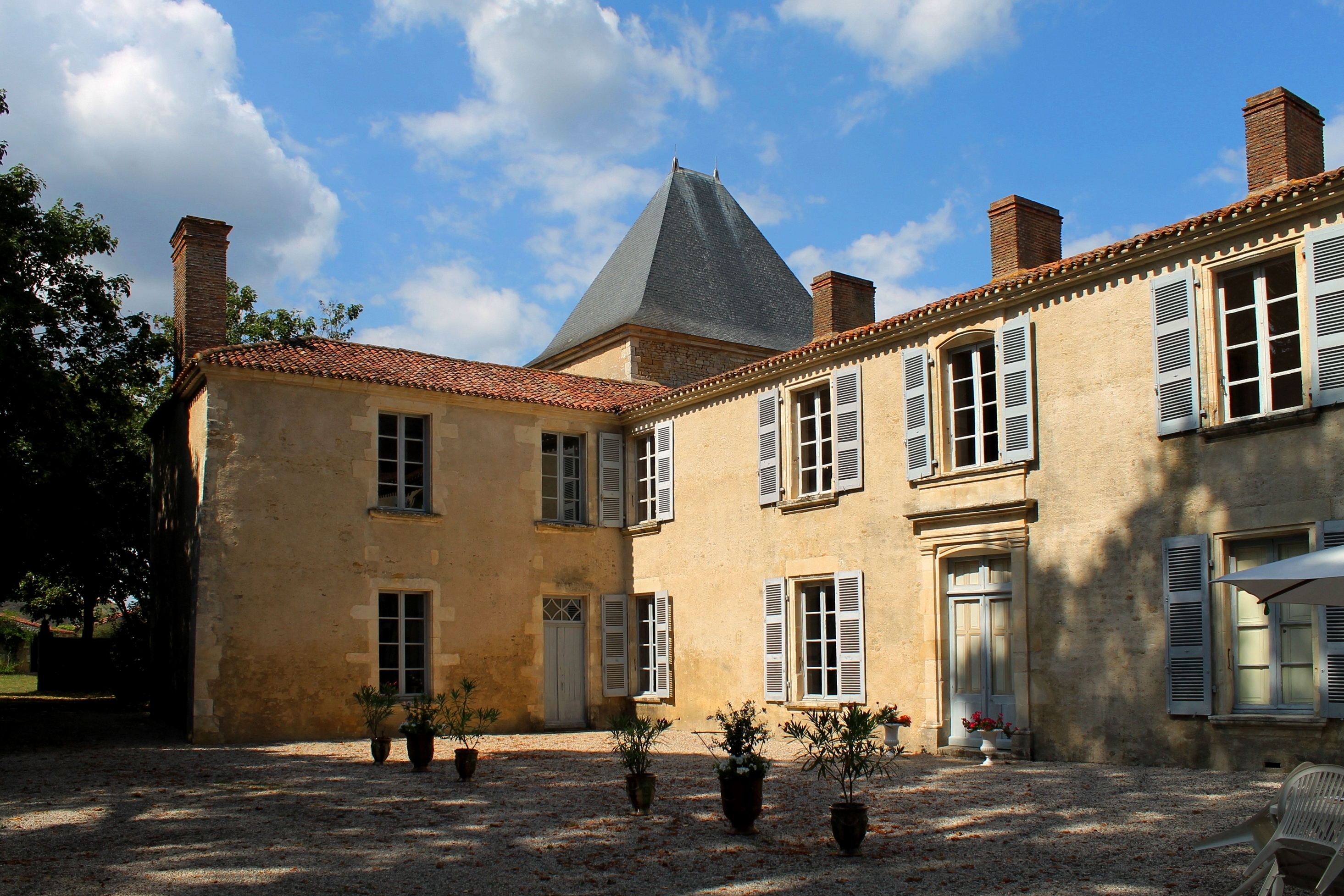
- Château de Bessay

- Coat of arms
- Location of Bessay
- Location within France Location within Pays de la Loire
- Coordinates: 46°32′19″N 1°09′11″W
- Country: France
- Region: Pays de la Loire
- Department: Vendée
- Arrondissement: Fontenay-le-Comte
- Canton: Mareuil-sur-Lay-Dissais

Government
  - Mayor (2020–2026): Jean-Marie Soulard
- Area^{1}: 10.79 km^{2} (4.17 sq mi)
- Highest elevation: 48 m (157 ft)
- Lowest elevation: 2 m (6.6 ft)
- Population (2023): 456
  - Density: 42.3/km^{2} (109/sq mi)
- Time zone: UTC+01:00 (CET)
  - Summer (DST): UTC+02:00 (CEST)
- INSEE/Postal code: 85023 /85320
- ^{1} French Land Register data, which excludes lakes, ponds, glaciers > 1 km^{2} (0.386 sq mi or 247 acres) and river estuaries.

Bessay (French pronunciation: [bɛsɛ]) is a commune in the Vendée department in the Pays de la Loire region in western France.

== Geography ==
The river Smagne forms all of the commune's southern border, then flows into the Lay, which flows southwestward through the north-western part of the commune.

== See also ==
- Communes of the Vendée department
