= Saint-Pierre-du-Chemin =

- Commune
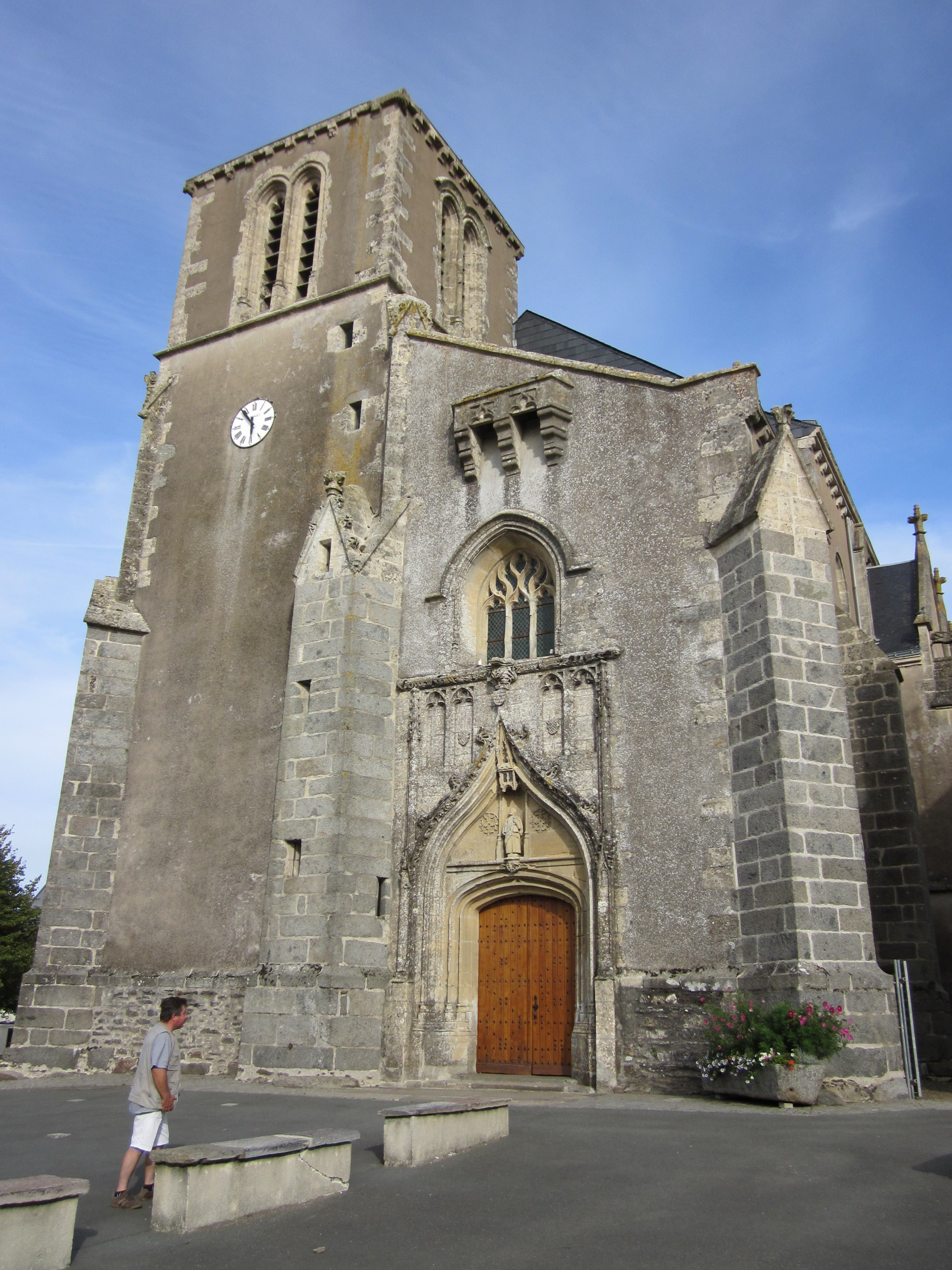
- The church in Saint-Pierre-du-Chemin
- Location of Saint-Pierre-du-Chemin
- Location within France Location within Pays de la Loire
- Coordinates: 46°41′49″N 0°41′55″W
- Country: France
- Region: Pays de la Loire
- Department: Vendée
- Arrondissement: Fontenay-le-Comte
- Canton: La Châtaigneraie
- Intercommunality: Pays de la Châtaigneraie

Government
  - Mayor (2020–2026): Daniel Mottard
- Area^{1}: 29.65 km^{2} (11.45 sq mi)
- Highest elevation: 237 m (778 ft)
- Lowest elevation: 133 m (436 ft)
- Population (2023): 1,354
  - Density: 45.67/km^{2} (118.3/sq mi)
- Time zone: UTC+01:00 (CET)
  - Summer (DST): UTC+02:00 (CEST)
- INSEE/Postal code: 85264 /85120
- ^{1} French Land Register data, which excludes lakes, ponds, glaciers > 1 km^{2} (0.386 sq mi or 247 acres) and river estuaries.

Saint-Pierre-du-Chemin (French pronunciation: [sɛ̃ pjɛʁ dy ʃəmɛ̃]) is a commune in the Vendée department in the Pays de la Loire region in western France.

== Personalities ==
It was the birthplace of Pierre Bersuire (c. 1290-1362).

== Geography ==
The river Lay has its source in the commune.

== See also ==
- Communes of the Vendée department
