= Curzon, Vendée =

Curzon
- Commune
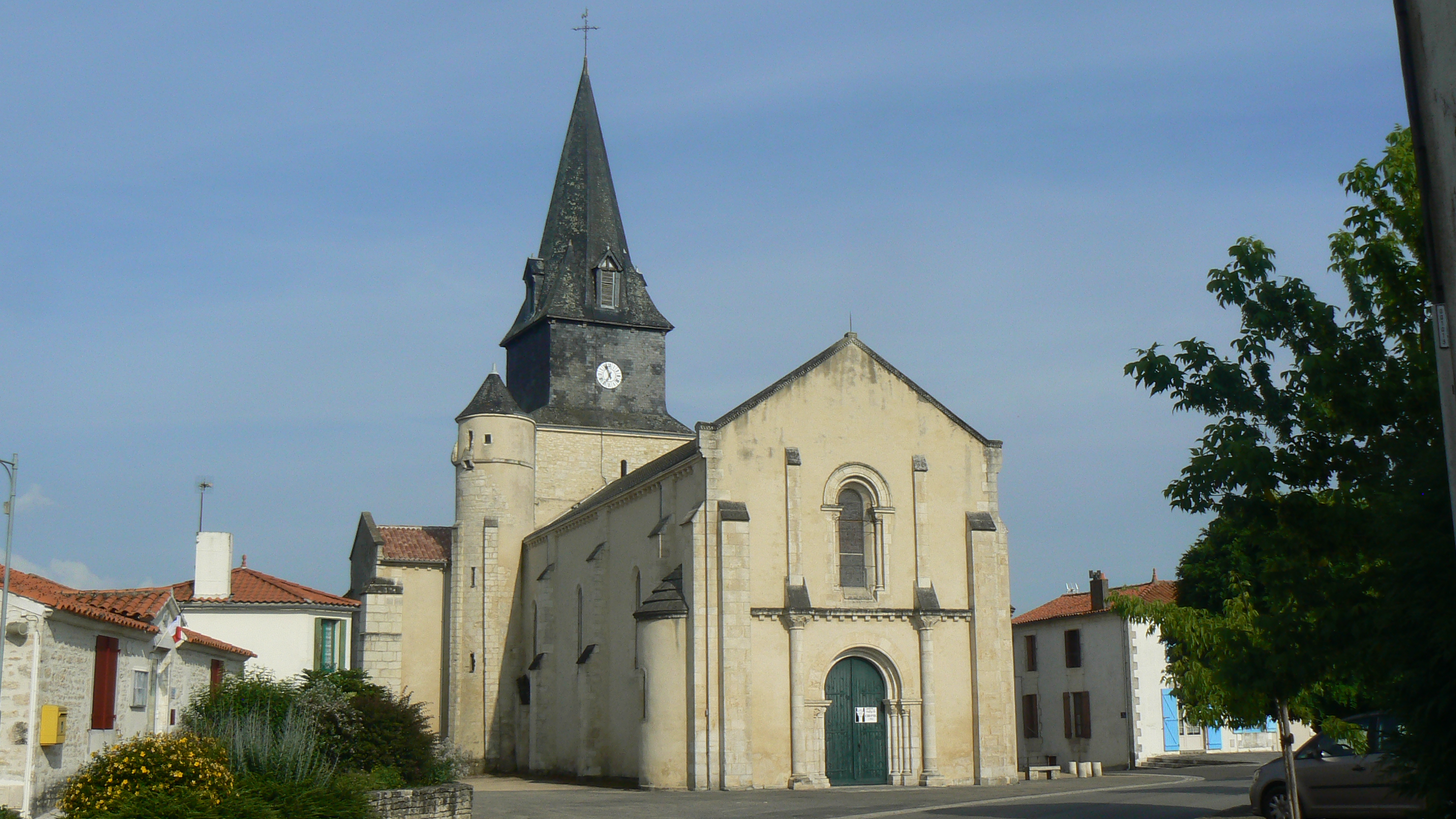
- The church of Saint-Romain, in Curzon

- Coat of arms
- Location of Curzon
- Location within France Location within Pays de la Loire
- Coordinates: 46°26′54″N 1°18′29″W
- Country: France
- Region: Pays de la Loire
- Department: Vendée
- Arrondissement: Les Sables-d'Olonne
- Canton: Mareuil-sur-Lay-Dissais
- Intercommunality: Vendée Grand Littoral

Government
  - Mayor (2020–2026): Didier Roux
- Area^{1}: 5.90 km^{2} (2.28 sq mi)
- Highest elevation: 23 m (75 ft)
- Lowest elevation: 0 m (0 ft)
- Population (2023): 481
  - Density: 81.5/km^{2} (211/sq mi)
- Time zone: UTC+01:00 (CET)
  - Summer (DST): UTC+02:00 (CEST)
- INSEE/Postal code: 85077 /85540
- ^{1} French Land Register data, which excludes lakes, ponds, glaciers > 1 km^{2} (0.386 sq mi or 247 acres) and river estuaries.

Curzon (French pronunciation: [kyʁzɔ̃]) is a commune in the Vendée department in the Pays de la Loire region in western France.

== Geography ==
The river Lay forms the commune's eastern border.

== See also ==
- Communes of the Vendée department
