= Le Champ-Saint-Père =

- Commune
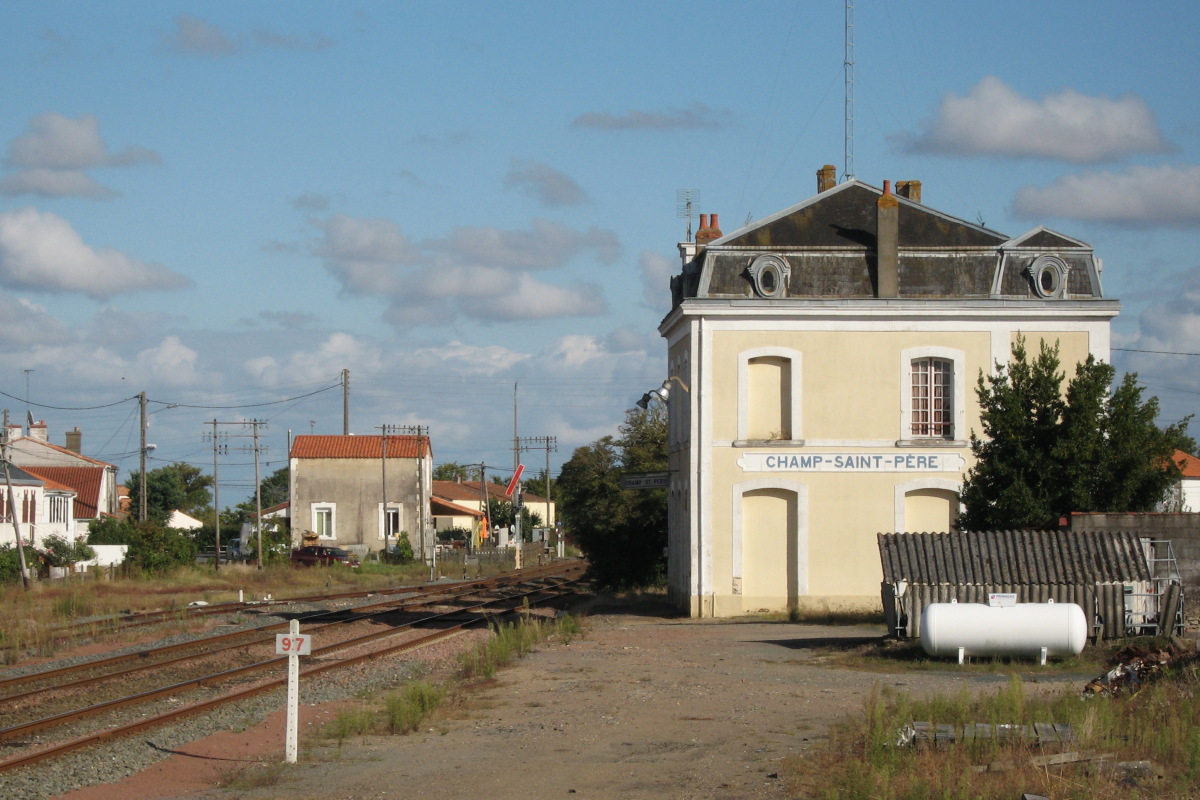
- The Champ-Saint-Père railway station

- Coat of arms
- Location of Le Champ-Saint-Père
- Location within France Location within Pays de la Loire
- Coordinates: 46°30′33″N 1°20′43″W
- Country: France
- Region: Pays de la Loire
- Department: Vendée
- Arrondissement: Les Sables-d'Olonne
- Canton: Mareuil-sur-Lay-Dissais
- Intercommunality: Vendée Grand Littoral

Government
  - Mayor (2020–2026): Jean Ferrand
- Area^{1}: 24.67 km^{2} (9.53 sq mi)
- Highest elevation: 75 m (246 ft)
- Lowest elevation: 1 m (3.3 ft)
- Population (2023): 2,135
  - Density: 86.54/km^{2} (224.1/sq mi)
- Time zone: UTC+01:00 (CET)
  - Summer (DST): UTC+02:00 (CEST)
- INSEE/Postal code: 85050 /85540
- ^{1} French Land Register data, which excludes lakes, ponds, glaciers > 1 km^{2} (0.386 sq mi or 247 acres) and river estuaries.

Le Champ-Saint-Père (French pronunciation: [lə ʃɑ̃ sɛ̃ pɛʁ]) is a commune in the Vendée department in the Pays de la Loire region in western France.

== Geography ==
The river Yon forms all of the commune's north-eastern border, then flows into the Lay, which forms all of its eastern border.

== Population ==
Historical population
Year	Pop.	±% p.a.
1968	1,201	—
1975	1,236	+0.41%
1982	1,376	+1.54%
1990	1,436	+0.53%
1999	1,316	−0.96%
2007	1,533	+1.93%
2012	1,777	+3.00%
2017	1,837	+0.67%
2023	2,135	+2.54%
Source: INSEE

== See also ==
- Communes of the Vendée department
