= Chaix =

- Part of Auchay-sur-Vendée
- Coat of arms
- Location of Chaix
- Location within France Location within Pays de la Loire
- Coordinates: 46°26′00″N 0°51′15″W
- Country: France
- Region: Pays de la Loire
- Department: Vendée
- Arrondissement: Fontenay-le-Comte
- Canton: Fontenay-le-Comte
- Commune: Auchay-sur-Vendée
- Area^{1}: 7.37 km^{2} (2.85 sq mi)
- Highest elevation: 37 m (121 ft)
- Lowest elevation: 2 m (6.6 ft)
- Population (2022): 475
  - Density: 64.5/km^{2} (167/sq mi)
- Time zone: UTC+01:00 (CET)
  - Summer (DST): UTC+02:00 (CEST)
- Postal code: 85200
- ^{1} French Land Register data, which excludes lakes, ponds, glaciers > 1 km^{2} (0.386 sq mi or 247 acres) and river estuaries.

Chaix is a former commune in the Vendée department in the Pays de la Loire region in western France. On 1 January 2017, it was merged into the new commune Auchay-sur-Vendée.

== See also ==
- Communes of the Vendée department
