= Mareuil-sur-Lay-Dissais =

- Commune
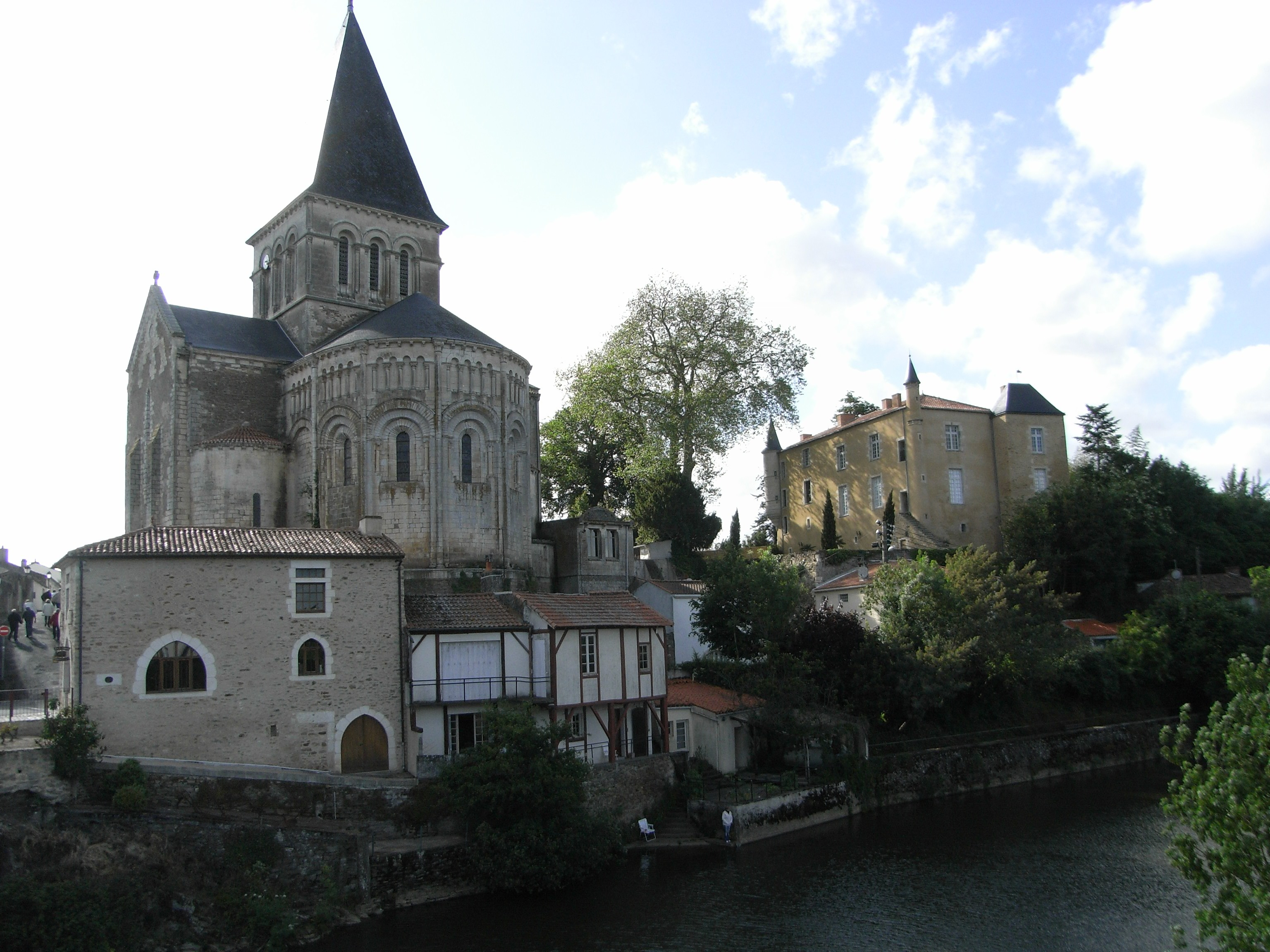
- The church in Mareuil-sur-Lay-Dissais

- Coat of arms
- Location of Mareuil-sur-Lay-Dissais
- Location within France Location within Pays de la Loire
- Coordinates: 46°32′07″N 1°13′39″W
- Country: France
- Region: Pays de la Loire
- Department: Vendée
- Arrondissement: Fontenay-le-Comte
- Canton: Mareuil-sur-Lay-Dissais

Government
  - Mayor (2020–2026): Vincent Jules
- Area^{1}: 25.65 km^{2} (9.90 sq mi)
- Elevation: 23 m (75 ft)
- Highest elevation: 78 m (256 ft)
- Lowest elevation: 0 m (0 ft)
- Population (2023): 2,808
  - Density: 109.5/km^{2} (283.5/sq mi)
- Time zone: UTC+01:00 (CET)
  - Summer (DST): UTC+02:00 (CEST)
- INSEE/Postal code: 85135 /85320
- ^{1} French Land Register data, which excludes lakes, ponds, glaciers > 1 km^{2} (0.386 sq mi or 247 acres) and river estuaries.

Mareuil-sur-Lay-Dissais (French pronunciation: [maʁœj syʁ lɛ disɛ]) is a commune in the Vendée department in the Pays de la Loire region in western France.

== Geography ==
The river Smagne forms part of the commune's eastern border, then flows into the Lay, which flows southwestward through the commune and crosses the village.

== Population ==
Historical population
Year	Pop.	±% p.a.
1968	1,773	—
1975	1,831	+0.46%
1982	2,012	+1.36%
1990	2,207	+1.16%
1999	2,277	+0.35%
2007	2,588	+1.61%
2012	2,787	+1.49%
2017	2,813	+0.19%
2023	2,808	−0.03%
Source: INSEE

== Known for ==
- Birthplace of businessman Christophe de Margerie (1951-214)
- Home of Distillerie Vrignaud, founded in 1812, whose best known product is Kamok, a coffee liqueur.

== See also ==
- Communes of the Vendée department
