= Dompierre-sur-Yon =

- Commune
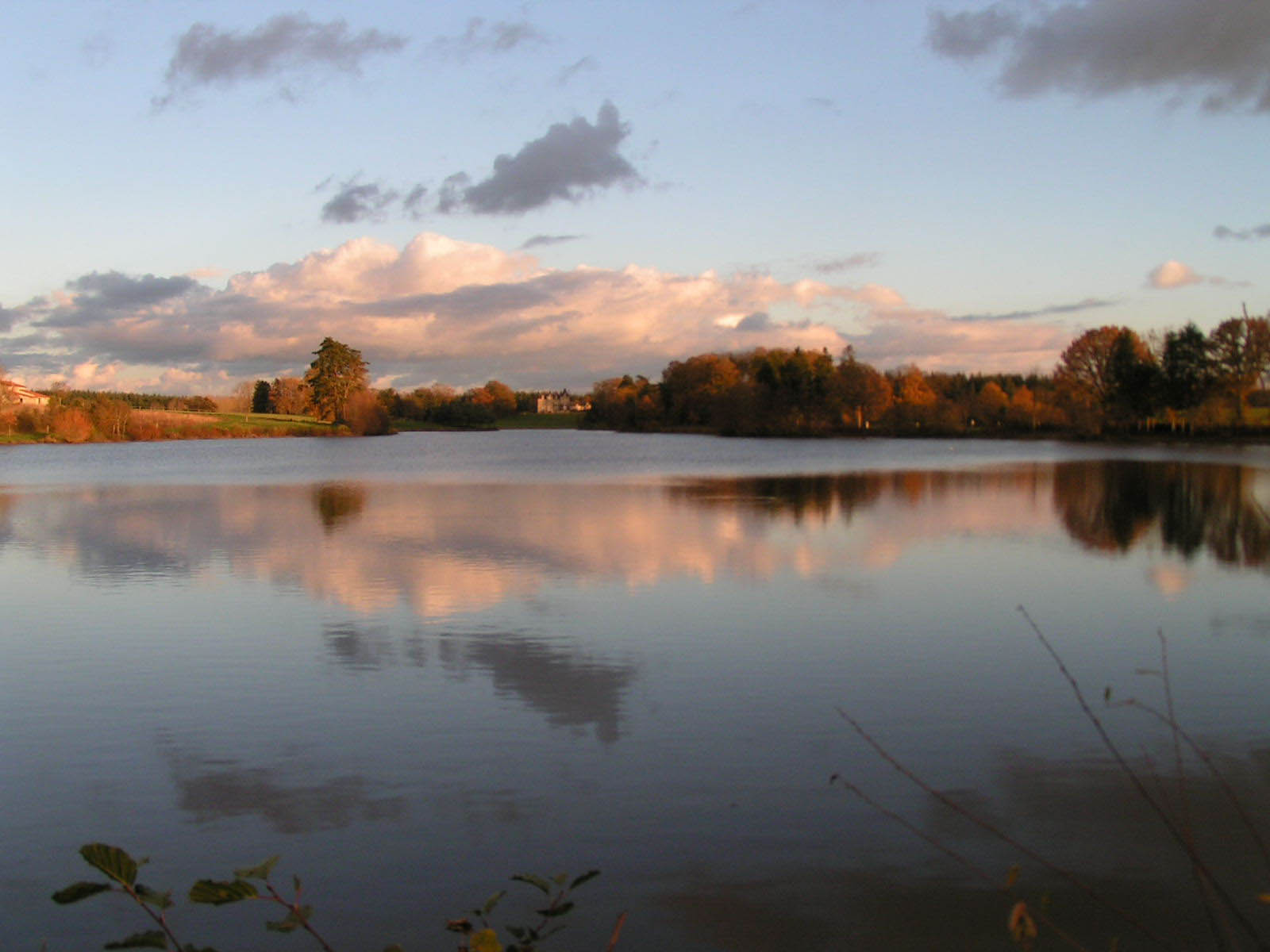
- The château of Rortheau beyond the lake
- Location of Dompierre-sur-Yon
- Location within France Location within Pays de la Loire
- Coordinates: 46°44′14″N 1°23′07″W
- Country: France
- Region: Pays de la Loire
- Department: Vendée
- Arrondissement: La Roche-sur-Yon
- Canton: La Roche-sur-Yon-1
- Intercommunality: La Roche-sur-Yon Agglomération

Government
  - Mayor (2020–2026): François Gilet
- Area^{1}: 33.60 km^{2} (12.97 sq mi)
- Highest elevation: 94 m (308 ft)
- Lowest elevation: 56 m (184 ft)
- Population (2023): 4,625
  - Density: 137.6/km^{2} (356.5/sq mi)
- Time zone: UTC+01:00 (CET)
  - Summer (DST): UTC+02:00 (CEST)
- INSEE/Postal code: 85081 /85170
- ^{1} French Land Register data, which excludes lakes, ponds, glaciers > 1 km^{2} (0.386 sq mi or 247 acres) and river estuaries.

Dompierre-sur-Yon (French pronunciation: [dɔ̃pjɛʁ syʁ jɔ̃], literally Dompierre on Yon) is a commune in the Vendée department in the Pays de la Loire region in western France.

== Geography ==
The river Yon forms the commune's southeastern border.

== Population ==
Historical population
Year	Pop.	±% p.a.
1968	1,339	—
1975	1,547	+2.08%
1982	2,358	+6.21%
1990	2,975	+2.95%
1999	3,191	+0.78%
2007	3,886	+2.49%
2012	4,102	+1.09%
2017	4,244	+0.68%
2023	4,625	+1.44%
Source: INSEE

== See also ==
- Communes of the Vendée department
