= Rosnay, Vendée =

Rosnay
- Commune
- Location of Rosnay
- Location within France Location within Pays de la Loire
- Coordinates: 46°32′27″N 1°18′27″W
- Country: France
- Region: Pays de la Loire
- Department: Vendée
- Arrondissement: Fontenay-le-Comte
- Canton: Mareuil-sur-Lay-Dissais

Government
  - Mayor (2020–2026): Bergerette Aulneau
- Area^{1}: 14.11 km^{2} (5.45 sq mi)
- Highest elevation: 78 m (256 ft)
- Lowest elevation: 2 m (6.6 ft)
- Population (2023): 672
  - Density: 47.6/km^{2} (123/sq mi)
- Time zone: UTC+01:00 (CET)
  - Summer (DST): UTC+02:00 (CEST)
- INSEE/Postal code: 85193 /85320
- ^{1} French Land Register data, which excludes lakes, ponds, glaciers > 1 km^{2} (0.386 sq mi or 247 acres) and river estuaries.

Rosnay (French pronunciation: [ʁonɛ]) is a commune in the Vendée department in the Pays de la Loire region in western France.

== Geography ==
The river Yon forms all of the commune's south-western border, then flows into the Lay, which forms part of its southern border.

== See also ==
- Communes of the Vendée department
