= Le Givre =

- Commune
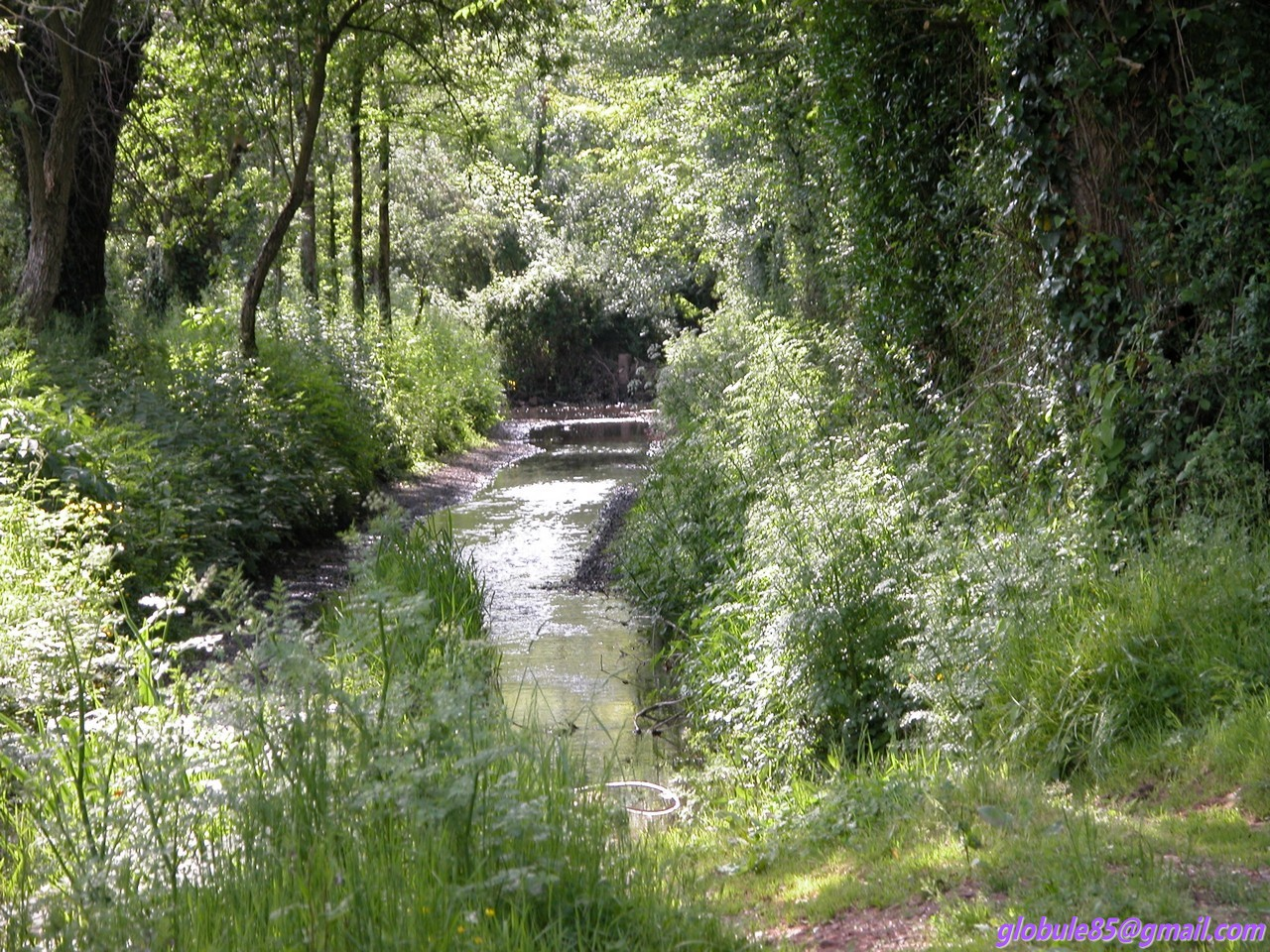
- The La Givre countryside, crossed by a tributary of the Troussepoil river

- Coat of arms
- Location of Le Givre
- Location within France Location within Pays de la Loire
- Coordinates: 46°27′50″N 1°23′52″W
- Country: France
- Region: Pays de la Loire
- Department: Vendée
- Arrondissement: Les Sables-d'Olonne
- Canton: Mareuil-sur-Lay-Dissais
- Intercommunality: Vendée Grand Littoral

Government
  - Mayor (2023–2026): Jennifer Libaud
- Area^{1}: 12.42 km^{2} (4.80 sq mi)
- Highest elevation: 72 m (236 ft)
- Lowest elevation: 2 m (6.6 ft)
- Population (2023): 535
  - Density: 43.1/km^{2} (112/sq mi)
- Time zone: UTC+01:00 (CET)
  - Summer (DST): UTC+02:00 (CEST)
- INSEE/Postal code: 85101 /85540
- ^{1} French Land Register data, which excludes lakes, ponds, glaciers > 1 km^{2} (0.386 sq mi or 247 acres) and river estuaries.

Le Givre (French pronunciation: [lə ʒivʁ]) is a commune in the Vendée department in the Pays de la Loire region in western France.

== See also ==
- Communes of the Vendée department
