= Bazoges-en-Pareds =

- Commune
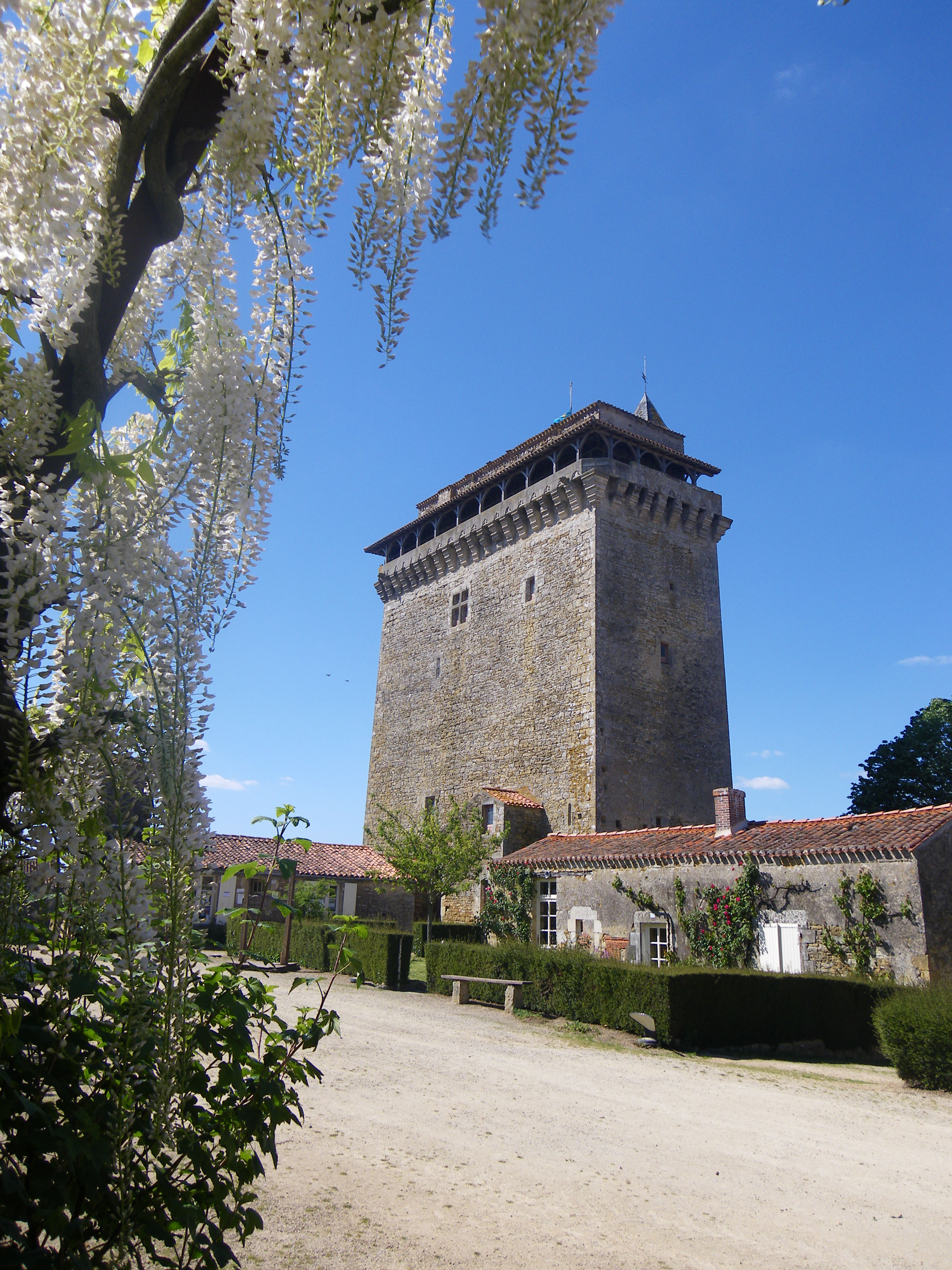
- The keep in Bazoges-en-Pareds

- Coat of arms
- Location of Bazoges-en-Pareds
- Location within France Location within Pays de la Loire
- Coordinates: 46°39′25″N 0°54′53″W
- Country: France
- Region: Pays de la Loire
- Department: Vendée
- Arrondissement: Fontenay-le-Comte
- Canton: La Châtaigneraie
- Intercommunality: Pays de la Châtaigneraie

Government
  - Mayor (2024–2026): Christine Lelot
- Area^{1}: 33.83 km^{2} (13.06 sq mi)
- Highest elevation: 122 m (400 ft)
- Lowest elevation: 37 m (121 ft)
- Population (2023): 1,184
  - Density: 35.00/km^{2} (90.65/sq mi)
- Time zone: UTC+01:00 (CET)
  - Summer (DST): UTC+02:00 (CEST)
- INSEE/Postal code: 85014 /85390
- ^{1} French Land Register data, which excludes lakes, ponds, glaciers > 1 km^{2} (0.386 sq mi or 247 acres) and river estuaries.

Bazoges-en-Pareds (French pronunciation: [bazɔʒ ɑ̃ paʁɛ]) is a commune in the Vendée department in the Pays de la Loire region in western France.

== Geography ==
The river Lay forms part of the commune's western border.

== See also ==
- Communes of the Vendée department
