= La Boissière-des-Landes =

- Commune
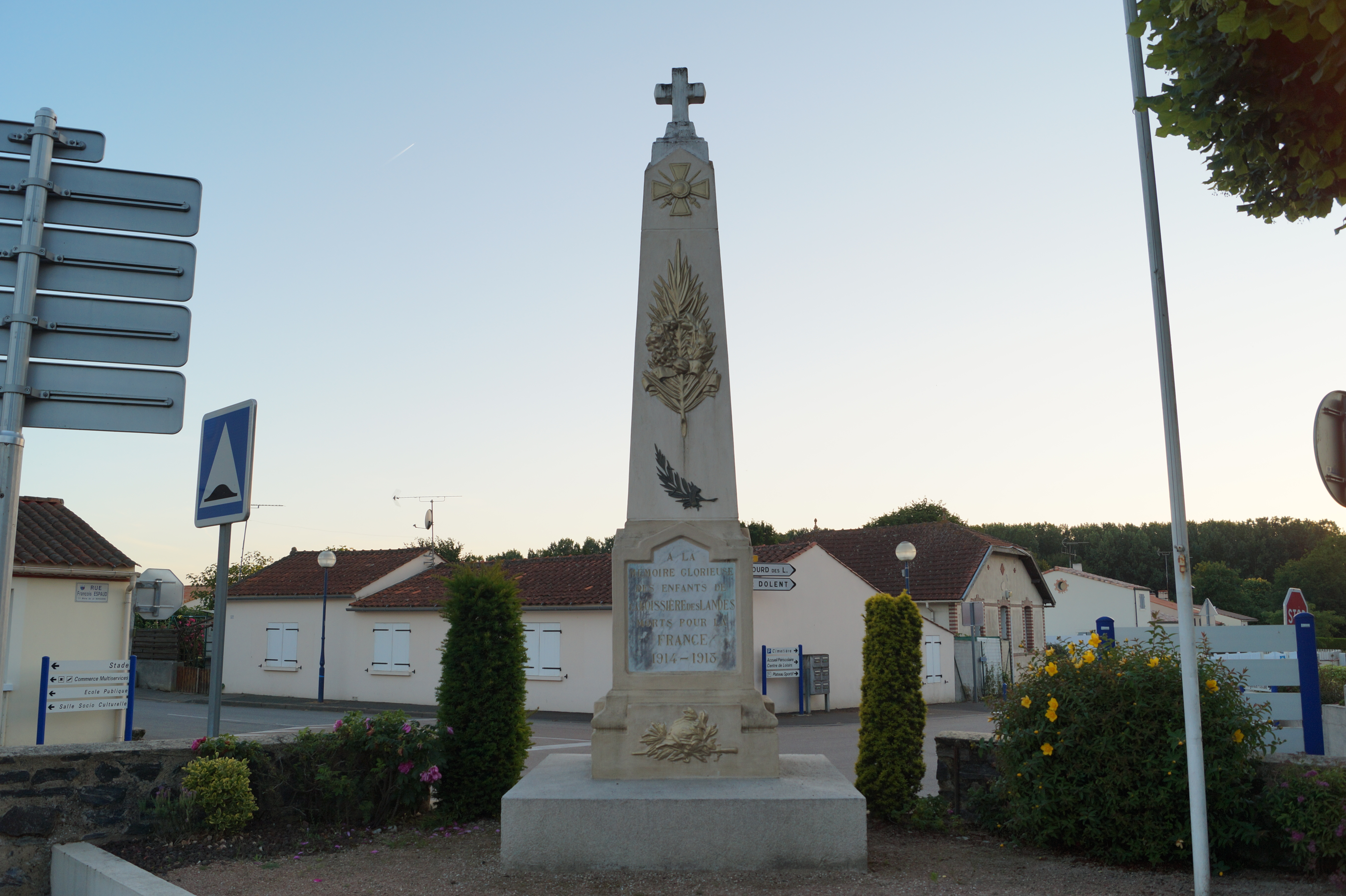

- Coat of arms
- Location of La Boissière-des-Landes
- Location within France Location within Pays de la Loire
- Coordinates: 46°33′56″N 1°27′39″W
- Country: France
- Region: Pays de la Loire
- Department: Vendée
- Arrondissement: Les Sables-d'Olonne
- Canton: Mareuil-sur-Lay-Dissais

Government
  - Mayor (2020–2026): Michel Chadeneau
- Area^{1}: 23.74 km^{2} (9.17 sq mi)
- Highest elevation: 82 m (269 ft)
- Lowest elevation: 32 m (105 ft)
- Population (2023): 1,464
  - Density: 61.67/km^{2} (159.7/sq mi)
- Time zone: UTC+01:00 (CET)
  - Summer (DST): UTC+02:00 (CEST)
- INSEE/Postal code: 85026 /85430
- ^{1} French Land Register data, which excludes lakes, ponds, glaciers > 1 km^{2} (0.386 sq mi or 247 acres) and river estuaries.

La Boissière-des-Landes (French pronunciation: [la bwasjɛʁ de lɑ̃d]) is a commune in the Vendée department in the Pays de la Loire region in western France.

== See also ==
- Communes of the Vendée department
