= La Couture, Vendée =

La Couture
- Commune
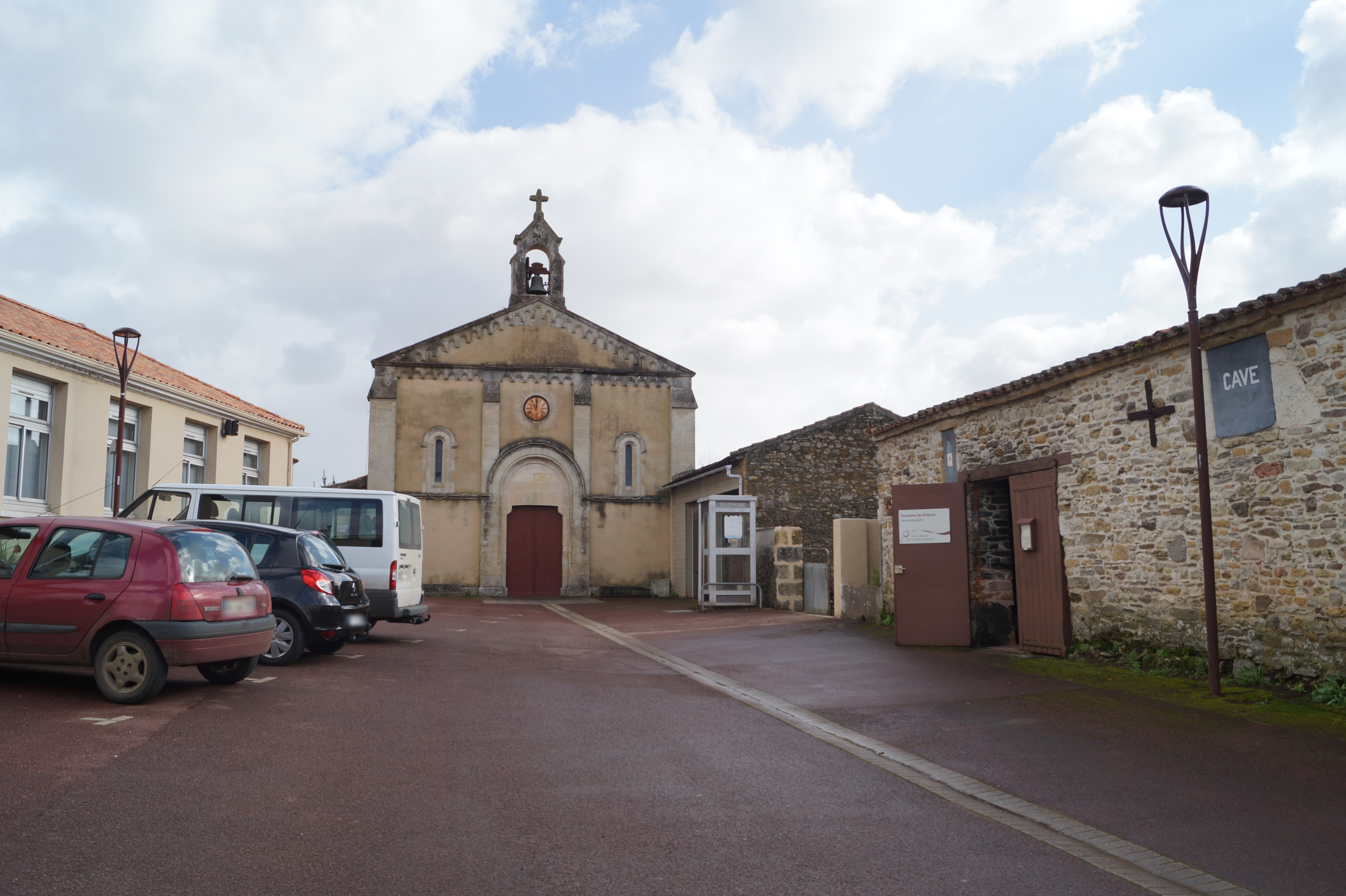
- Location of La Couture
- Location within France Location within Pays de la Loire
- Coordinates: 46°31′18″N 1°15′45″W
- Country: France
- Region: Pays de la Loire
- Department: Vendée
- Arrondissement: Fontenay-le-Comte
- Canton: Mareuil-sur-Lay-Dissais

Government
  - Mayor (2020–2026): Thierry Priouzeau
- Area^{1}: 7.03 km^{2} (2.71 sq mi)
- Highest elevation: 60 m (200 ft)
- Lowest elevation: 2 m (6.6 ft)
- Population (2023): 231
  - Density: 32.9/km^{2} (85.1/sq mi)
- Time zone: UTC+01:00 (CET)
  - Summer (DST): UTC+02:00 (CEST)
- INSEE/Postal code: 85074 /85320
- ^{1} French Land Register data, which excludes lakes, ponds, glaciers > 1 km^{2} (0.386 sq mi or 247 acres) and river estuaries.

La Couture (French pronunciation: [la kutyʁ]) is a commune in the Vendée department in the Pays de la Loire region in western France.

== Geography ==
The river Lay forms most of the commune's eastern and south-western borders.

== See also ==
- Communes of the Vendée department
