= Saint-Martin-des-Noyers =

- Commune
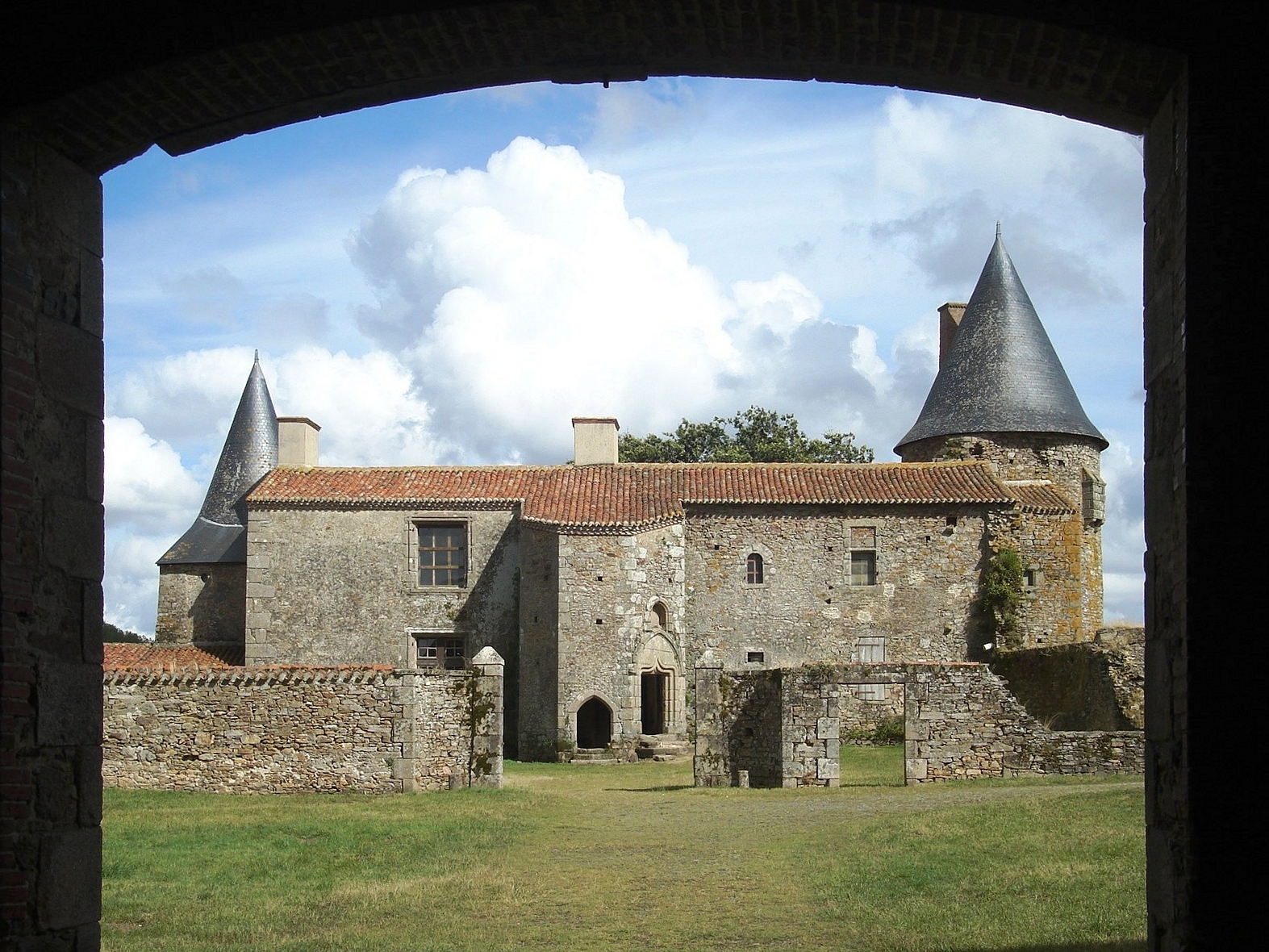
- The Château de la Grève

- Coat of arms
- Location of Saint-Martin-des-Noyers
- Location within France Location within Pays de la Loire
- Coordinates: 46°43′21″N 1°10′37″W
- Country: France
- Region: Pays de la Loire
- Department: Vendée
- Arrondissement: La Roche-sur-Yon
- Canton: Chantonnay
- Intercommunality: Pays de Chantonnay

Government
  - Mayor (2020–2026): Christophe Gouraud
- Area^{1}: 41.74 km^{2} (16.12 sq mi)
- Highest elevation: 118 m (387 ft)
- Lowest elevation: 58 m (190 ft)
- Population (2023): 2,560
  - Density: 61.3/km^{2} (159/sq mi)
- Time zone: UTC+01:00 (CET)
  - Summer (DST): UTC+02:00 (CEST)
- INSEE/Postal code: 85246 /85140
- ^{1} French Land Register data, which excludes lakes, ponds, glaciers > 1 km^{2} (0.386 sq mi or 247 acres) and river estuaries.

Saint-Martin-des-Noyers (French pronunciation: [sɛ̃ maʁtɛ̃ de nwaje]) is a commune in the Vendée department in the Pays de la Loire region in western France.

== Geography ==
The river Yon has its source in the commune and forms part of its southern border.

== Population ==
Historical population
Year	Pop.	±% p.a.
1968	1,655	—
1975	1,769	+0.96%
1982	1,867	+0.77%
1990	1,953	+0.56%
1999	2,003	+0.28%
2007	2,179	+1.06%
2012	2,254	+0.68%
2017	2,372	+1.03%
2023	2,560	+1.28%
Source: INSEE

== See also ==
- Communes of the Vendée department
