= Saint-Benoist-sur-Mer =

- Commune
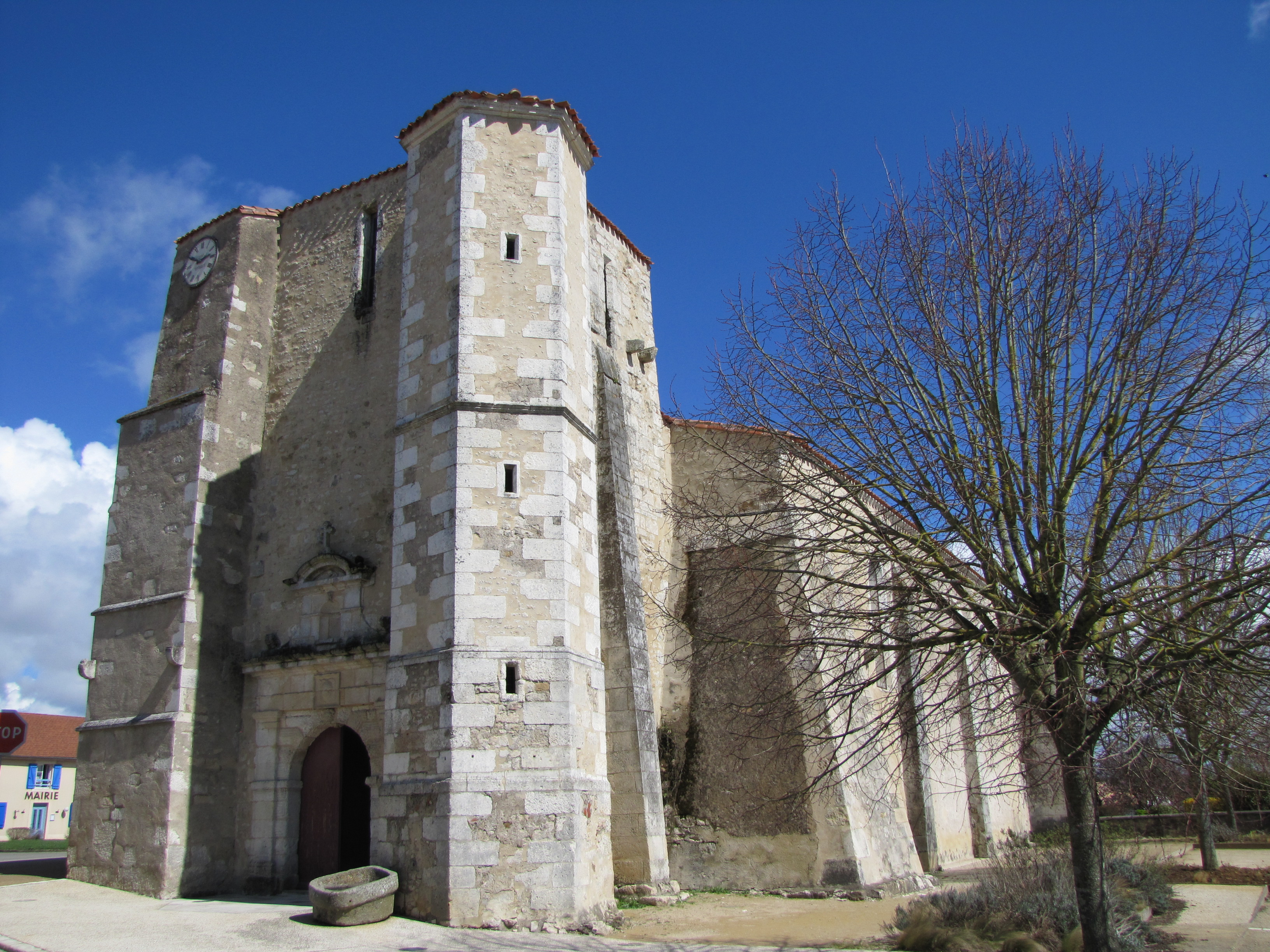
- The church of Saint-Benoît, in Saint-Benoist-sur-Mer

- Coat of arms
- Location of Saint-Benoist-sur-Mer
- Location within France Location within Pays de la Loire
- Coordinates: 46°25′28″N 1°21′12″W
- Country: France
- Region: Pays de la Loire
- Department: Vendée
- Arrondissement: Les Sables-d'Olonne
- Canton: Mareuil-sur-Lay-Dissais

Government
  - Mayor (2020–2026): Daniel Neau
- Area^{1}: 15.53 km^{2} (6.00 sq mi)
- Highest elevation: 26 m (85 ft)
- Lowest elevation: 1 m (3.3 ft)
- Population (2023): 515
  - Density: 33.2/km^{2} (85.9/sq mi)
- Time zone: UTC+01:00 (CET)
  - Summer (DST): UTC+02:00 (CEST)
- INSEE/Postal code: 85201 /85540
- ^{1} French Land Register data, which excludes lakes, ponds, glaciers > 1 km^{2} (0.386 sq mi or 247 acres) and river estuaries.

Saint-Benoist-sur-Mer (French pronunciation: [sɛ̃ bənwa syʁ mɛʁ], literally Saint Benoist on sea) is a commune in the Vendée department in the Pays de la Loire region in western France.

== Geography ==
The river Lay forms most of the commune's south-eastern border.

== See also ==
- Communes of the Vendée department
