= Saint-Sulpice-le-Verdon =

- Part of Montréverd
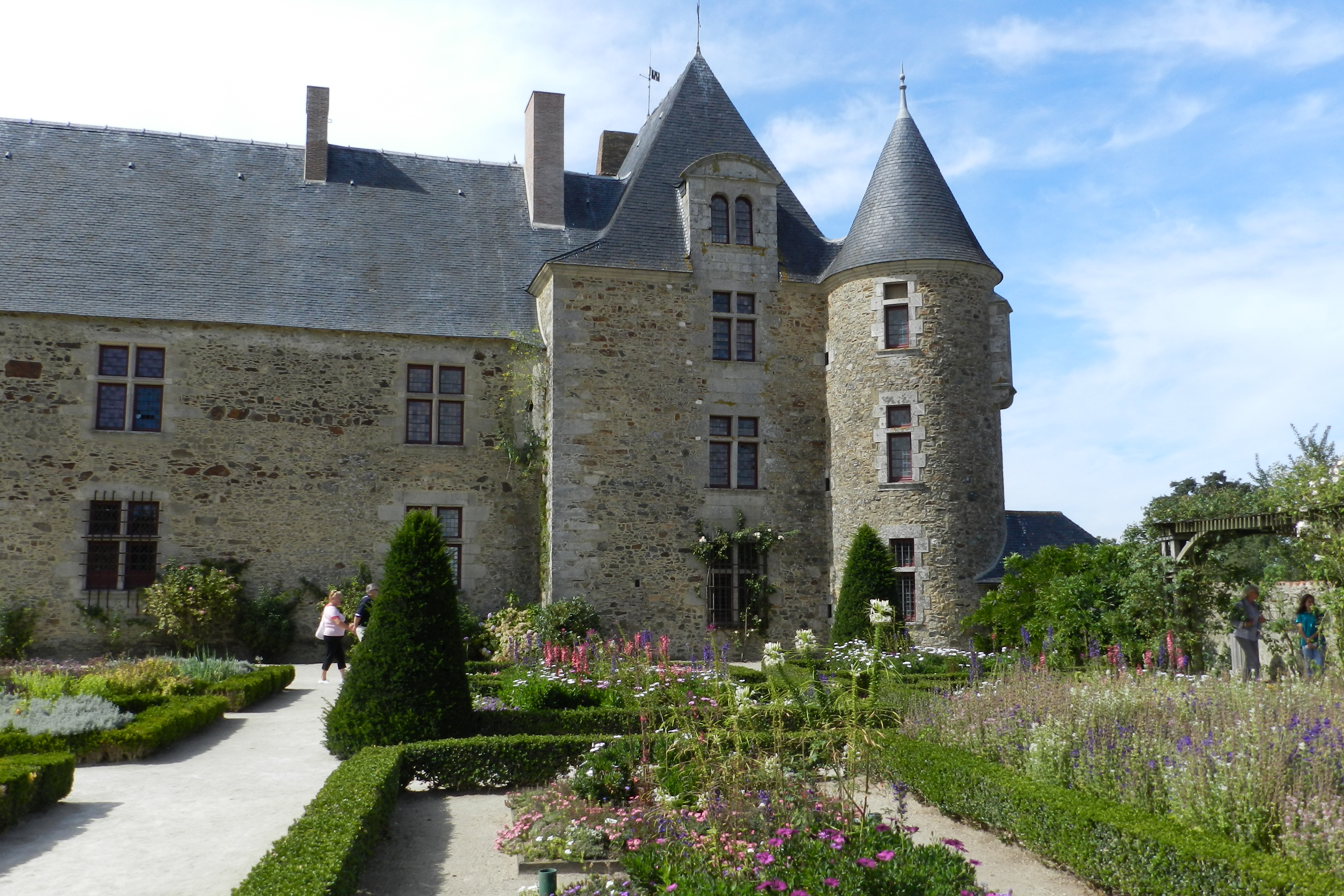
- The Château of La Chabotterie

- Coat of arms
- Location of Saint-Sulpice-le-Verdon
- Location within France Location within Pays de la Loire
- Coordinates: 46°53′39″N 1°25′09″W
- Country: France
- Region: Pays de la Loire
- Department: Vendée
- Arrondissement: La Roche-sur-Yon
- Canton: Aizenay
- Commune: Montréverd
- Area^{1}: 14.07 km^{2} (5.43 sq mi)
- Highest elevation: 74 m (243 ft)
- Lowest elevation: 54 m (177 ft)
- Population (2022): 1,144
  - Density: 81.31/km^{2} (210.6/sq mi)
- Time zone: UTC+01:00 (CET)
  - Summer (DST): UTC+02:00 (CEST)
- Postal code: 85260
- ^{1} French Land Register data, which excludes lakes, ponds, glaciers > 1 km^{2} (0.386 sq mi or 247 acres) and river estuaries.

Saint-Sulpice-le-Verdon (French pronunciation: [sɛ̃ sylpis lə vɛʁdɔ̃]) is a former commune in the Vendée department in the Pays de la Loire region in western France. On 1 January 2016, it was merged into the new commune of Montréverd.

== See also ==
- Communes of the Vendée department
