= Belleville-sur-Vie =

- Part of Bellevigny
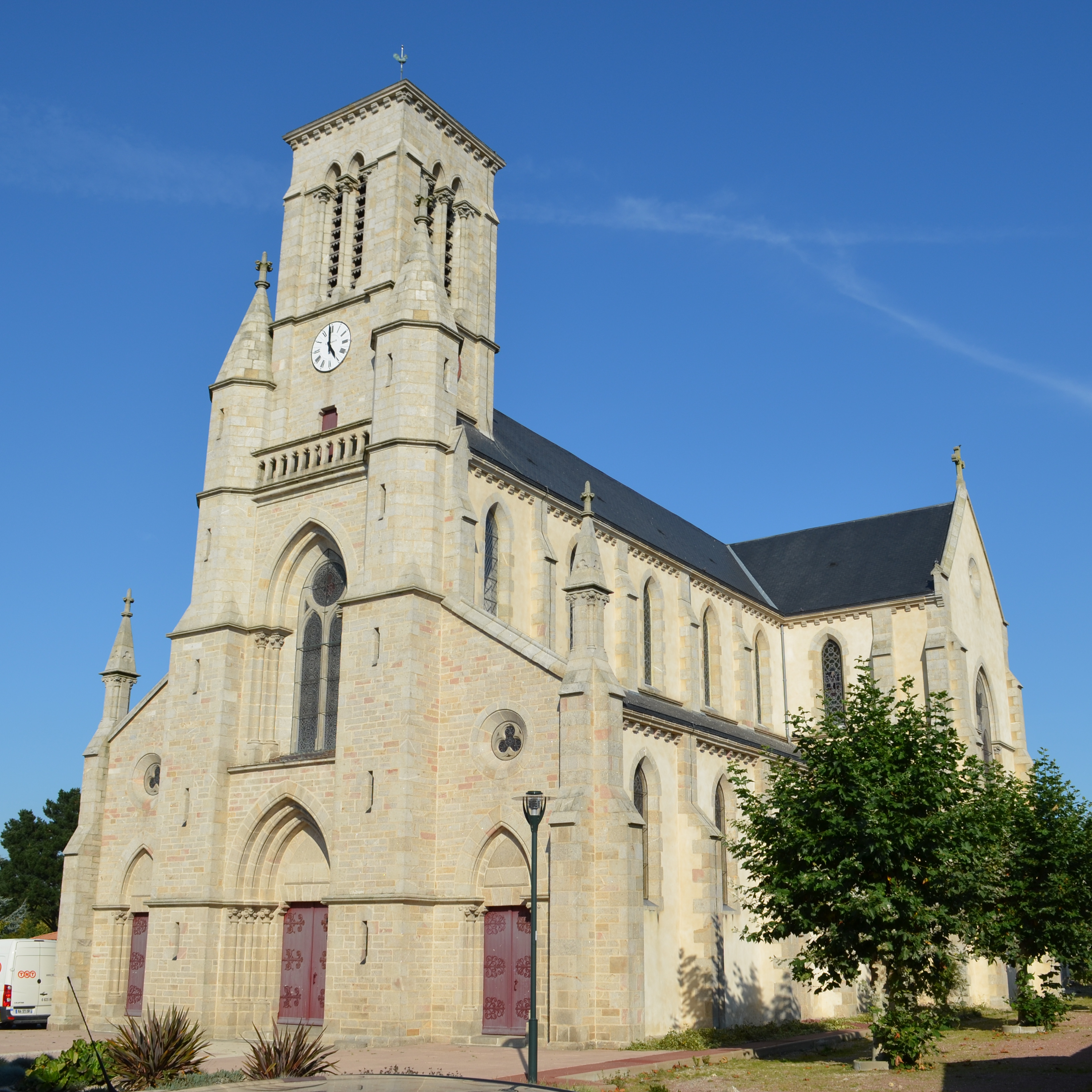
- The church of Belleville-sur-Vie

- Coat of arms
- Location of Belleville-sur-Vie
- Location within France Location within Pays de la Loire
- Coordinates: 46°47′03″N 1°25′48″W
- Country: France
- Region: Pays de la Loire
- Department: Vendée
- Arrondissement: La Roche-sur-Yon
- Canton: Aizenay
- Commune: Bellevigny
- Area^{1}: 15.16 km^{2} (5.85 sq mi)
- Highest elevation: 84 m (276 ft)
- Lowest elevation: 55 m (180 ft)
- Population (2022): 4,547
  - Density: 299.9/km^{2} (776.8/sq mi)
- Time zone: UTC+01:00 (CET)
  - Summer (DST): UTC+02:00 (CEST)
- Postal code: 85170
- ^{1} French Land Register data, which excludes lakes, ponds, glaciers > 1 km^{2} (0.386 sq mi or 247 acres) and river estuaries.

Belleville-sur-Vie (French pronunciation: [bɛlvil syʁ vi], literally Belleville on Vie) is a former commune in the Vendée department in the Pays de la Loire region in western France. On 1 January 2016, it was merged into the new commune of Bellevigny.

== Geography ==
Belleville-sur-Vie is situated 15km north of La Roche-sur-Yon and 40km from Saint-Gilles-Croix-de-Vie on the Atlantic coast. The commune has an area of 1516 ha. 17 ha comprises 4 parks and 32 ha of green spaces. The main water source is the river Vie, a 62km long stream empties into the Atlantic at Saint-Gilles-Croix-de-Vie. The river has four tributaries, the Jaunay, the Petite Boulogne, the Gué Gorand and the Ligneron.

In twenty years the region has doubled in population to the total of 3,838 (INSEE 01/01/2009). 58% of the population is 40 years old and younger and 36% less than 25 years old.

100 commercial enterprises employ around 1400 people in the area.

Belleville-sur-Vie belongs to the group of 'communes' of Boulogne which also includes: Aizenay, Beaufou, La Génétouze, Le Poiré-sur-Vie, Les Lucs-sur-Boulogne, St. Denis la Chevasse et Saligny. It also belongs equally to the region 'Yon et Vie' which is a part of 23 communities belonging to the region 'La Roche-sur-Yon'.

== Environment ==
Belleville-sur-Vie won two flowers at the cities and villages flowers competition (palmarès 2009). The first flower was awarded in 2007. The second flower was then awarded in 2009.

== History ==
From 935 AD, historians record a seigneur (lord) of Bellville. The fortified château of the seigneur of Belleville was constructed towards the end of the 11th century and included a moat. This familial line ended by 1306 with the death of the last male heir, Maurice de Belleville.

Maurice's sole and final heir Jeanne de Belleville outlived her Breton spouse Olivier who was executed on order of the king of France for the apparent crime of treason - his lands being summarily confiscated. Her lands were also confiscated and she was forced to flee. She subsequently became known as the Lioness of Brittany for her exploits in the Breton War of Succession.

Her daughter also called Jeanne, married into the Harpedanne family of Angevin/English origins and settled in Poitou until the war ended following the Treaty of Brétigny(1360). The Harpedanne family of Belleville eventually normalised relations with King Charles VI, and these new seigneurs of Belleville adopted the title at the start of the 15th century. In the second half of the 17th century the seigneur of Belleville was made a baron. Around 1850 the Baron constructed a Town Hall with the stones of the ancient former stately home of the seigneur.

A church of architectural importance was constructed at the end of the 17th century, and belongs to one of the most interesting eras of the Vendean Romanesque style of architecture ('epoque du roman vendéen' in French). Now in a ruinous state, all that remains is the portal composed of four concentric arches.

Belleville has a commemorative plaque for the vendéan army of 1793 when General Charette established a headquarters there during the terror (1794–95) for his efforts during the war forcing the 'blues' to sign the Treaty of La Jaunaye.

== Economy ==
The airline company French Bee, and its parent the Dubreuil Group (which also owns Air Caraïbes, headquartered elsewhere) have their head office in Belleville-sur-Vie.

== Education ==
The community has two public schools: École publique Les Chaumes, serving preschool and elementary school, and Collège Antoine de Saint-Exupery, - serving junior high school. The sole private school in the community is the École Primaire Privée Saint Augustin, a primary school.

The Belleville-sur-Vie community has a media centre. The library is in nearby Saligny.

== See also ==
- Communes of the Vendée department
