= Lhoumois =

- Commune
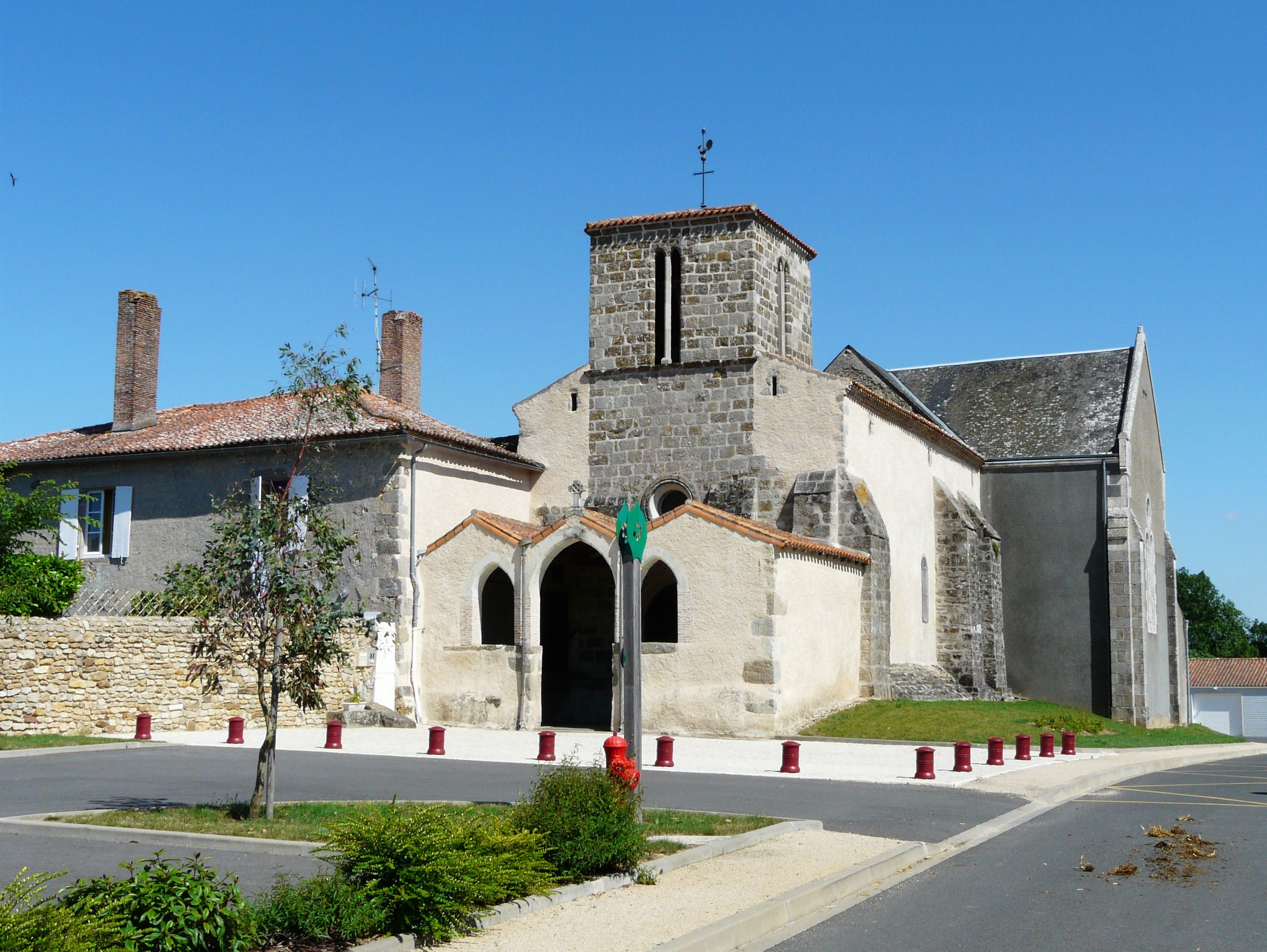
- The church in Lhoumois
- Location of Lhoumois
- Location within France Location within Nouvelle-Aquitaine
- Coordinates: 46°42′23″N 0°07′09″W
- Country: France
- Region: Nouvelle-Aquitaine
- Department: Deux-Sèvres
- Arrondissement: Parthenay
- Canton: La Gâtine
- Intercommunality: CC Parthenay-Gâtine

Government
  - Mayor (2020–2026): Jean Pillot
- Area^{1}: 9.67 km^{2} (3.73 sq mi)
- Elevation: 165 m (541 ft)
- Highest elevation: 172 m (564 ft)
- Lowest elevation: 95 m (312 ft)
- Population (2023): 157
  - Density: 16.2/km^{2} (42.1/sq mi)
- Time zone: UTC+01:00 (CET)
  - Summer (DST): UTC+02:00 (CEST)
- INSEE/Postal code: 79149 /79390
- ^{1} French Land Register data, which excludes lakes, ponds, glaciers > 1 km^{2} (0.386 sq mi or 247 acres) and river estuaries.

Lhoumois (French pronunciation: [lumwa]) is a commune in the Deux-Sèvres department in western France.

Royalist Leader and Survivor of the War in the Vendée, Charles Marie de Beaumont d'Autichamp lived the remaining years of his life in exile in Lhoumois before his death on 6 October 1859.

== See also ==
- Communes of the Deux-Sèvres department
