= Saligny, Vendée =

Saligny
- Part of Bellevigny
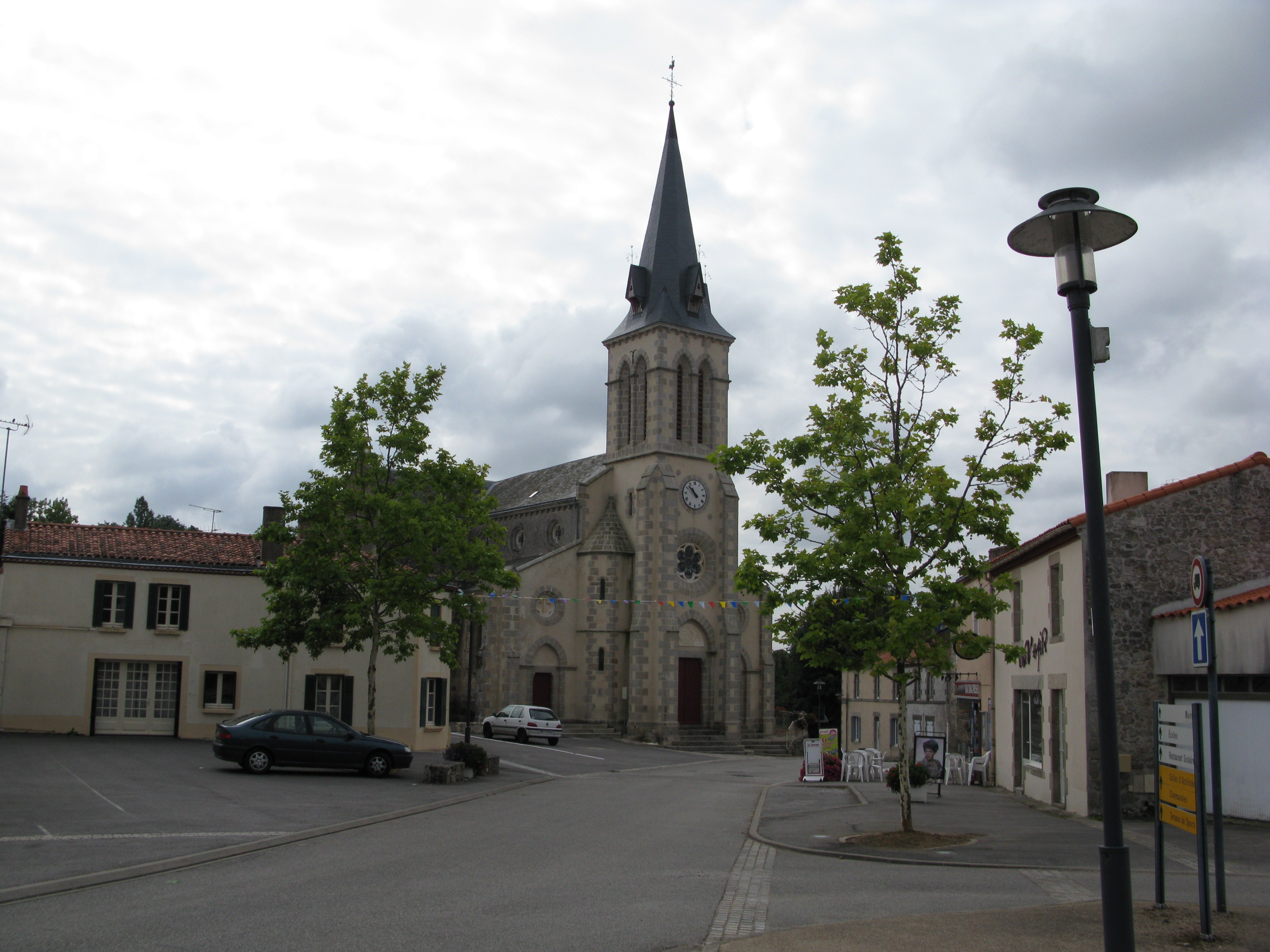
- The church in Saligny
- Location of Saligny
- Location within France Location within Pays de la Loire
- Coordinates: 46°48′31″N 1°25′26″W
- Country: France
- Region: Pays de la Loire
- Department: Vendée
- Arrondissement: La Roche-sur-Yon
- Canton: Aizenay
- Commune: Bellevigny
- Area^{1}: 23.36 km^{2} (9.02 sq mi)
- Highest elevation: 91 m (299 ft)
- Lowest elevation: 47 m (154 ft)
- Population (2022): 1,692
  - Density: 72.43/km^{2} (187.6/sq mi)
- Time zone: UTC+01:00 (CET)
  - Summer (DST): UTC+02:00 (CEST)
- Postal code: 85170
- ^{1} French Land Register data, which excludes lakes, ponds, glaciers > 1 km^{2} (0.386 sq mi or 247 acres) and river estuaries.

Saligny (French pronunciation: [saliɲi]) is a former commune in the Vendée department in the Pays de la Loire region in western France. On 1 January 2016, it was merged into the new commune of Bellevigny.

== Education ==
There is one public school, École publique Sablier du Frêne, and one private school, École Primaire Privée Sacré Cœur, in Saligny. The public junior middle school Collège Antoine de Saint-Exupery is in nearby Belleville-sur-Vie.

The Saligny community has a library; the media centre is in nearby Belleville-sur-Vie.

== See also ==
- Communes of the Vendée department
