= Beaufou =

- Commune
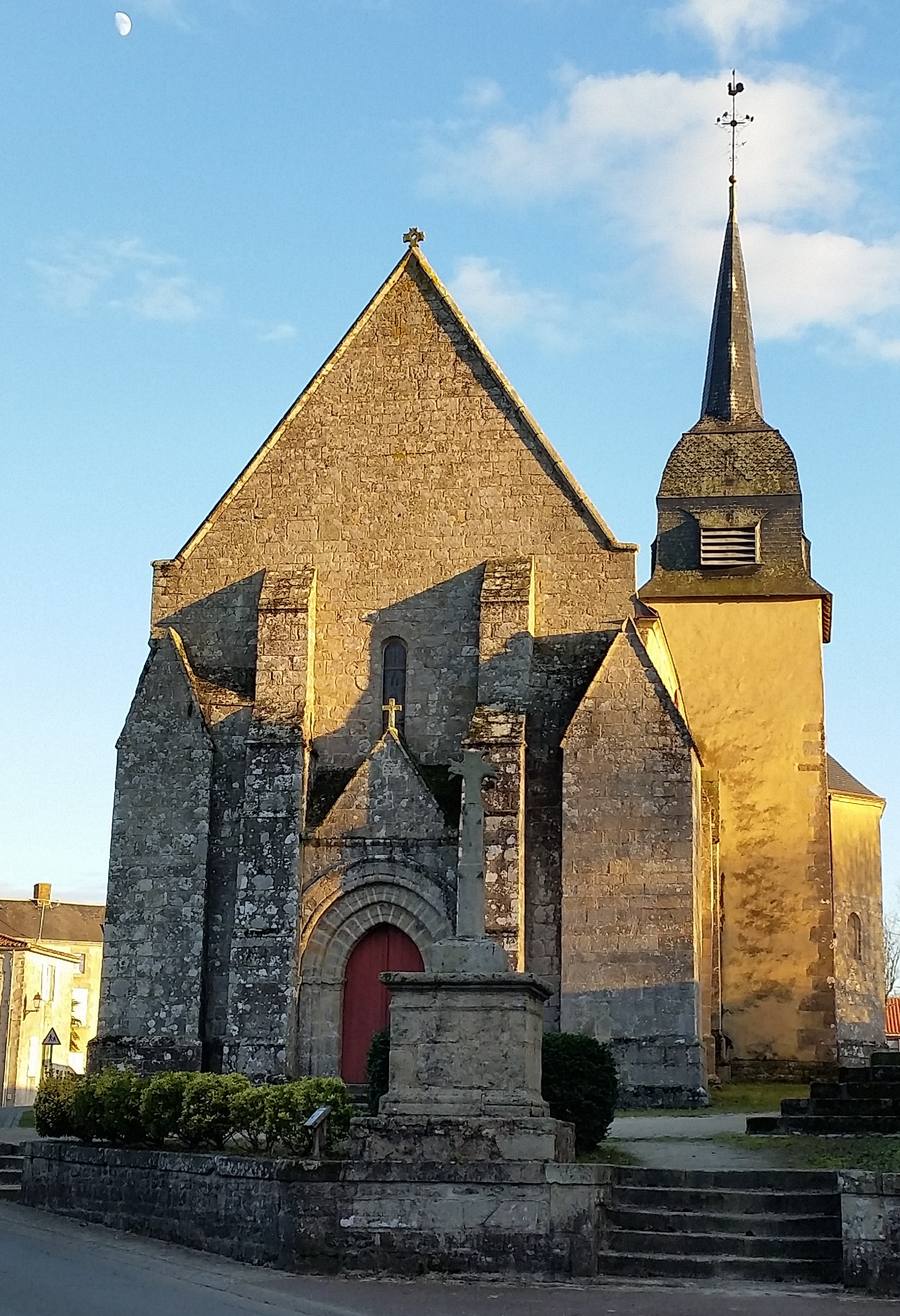

- Coat of arms
- Location of Beaufou
- Location within France Location within Pays de la Loire
- Coordinates: 46°49′28″N 1°31′46″W
- Country: France
- Region: Pays de la Loire
- Department: Vendée
- Arrondissement: La Roche-sur-Yon
- Canton: Aizenay
- Intercommunality: Vie et Boulogne

Government
  - Mayor (2020–2026): Delphine Hermouet
- Area^{1}: 29.06 km^{2} (11.22 sq mi)
- Highest elevation: 74 m (243 ft)
- Lowest elevation: 28 m (92 ft)
- Population (2023): 1,683
  - Density: 57.91/km^{2} (150.0/sq mi)
- Time zone: UTC+01:00 (CET)
  - Summer (DST): UTC+02:00 (CEST)
- INSEE/Postal code: 85015 /85170
- ^{1} French Land Register data, which excludes lakes, ponds, glaciers > 1 km^{2} (0.386 sq mi or 247 acres) and river estuaries.

Beaufou (French pronunciation: [bofu]) is a small village in the region of Pays de la Loire in western France. It is designated municipally as a commune within the département of Vendée.

== Geography ==
Beafou is located in the west of France, north of the Vendée department: 20 km north of La Roche-sur-Yon, 50 km south of Nantes, and 40 km from the Atlantic coast.

The municipal territory of Beaufou covers 2,798 hectares. The average altitude of the municipality is 62 meters, with height fluctuating between 28 and 74 meters.

== History ==
In Beaufou the traces of human presence date back to the Neolithic period. Polished stone axes were found at Auspierre, Boisrond, La Charnière and Pré-Sec.

The Roman road linking Saint-Georges-de-Montaigu to Sables d'Olonne crossed the town of Auspierre through Cantria and Marlaie.

The Romanesque church of Our Lady of the Annunciation, built in the twelfth century, depended on the abbey of Marmoutier-les-Tours (Indre-et-Loire). In March 1568, the church was burned by the Huguenots. From 1648, it fell under the diocese of Luçon and was restored in 1652. Around 1705, the priest, learning the apparitions at Paray-le-Monial in 1673 and 1675, launched the cult of the Sacred Heart.

In 1793 and 1794, during their 13 passages, the infernal columns massacred a large part of the population and burned 57 houses and the church, which was restored in the early nineteenth century.

== See also ==
- Communes of the Vendée department
