= Jean Baptiste Pierre Constant, Count of Suzannet =

French royalist officer (1772–1815)

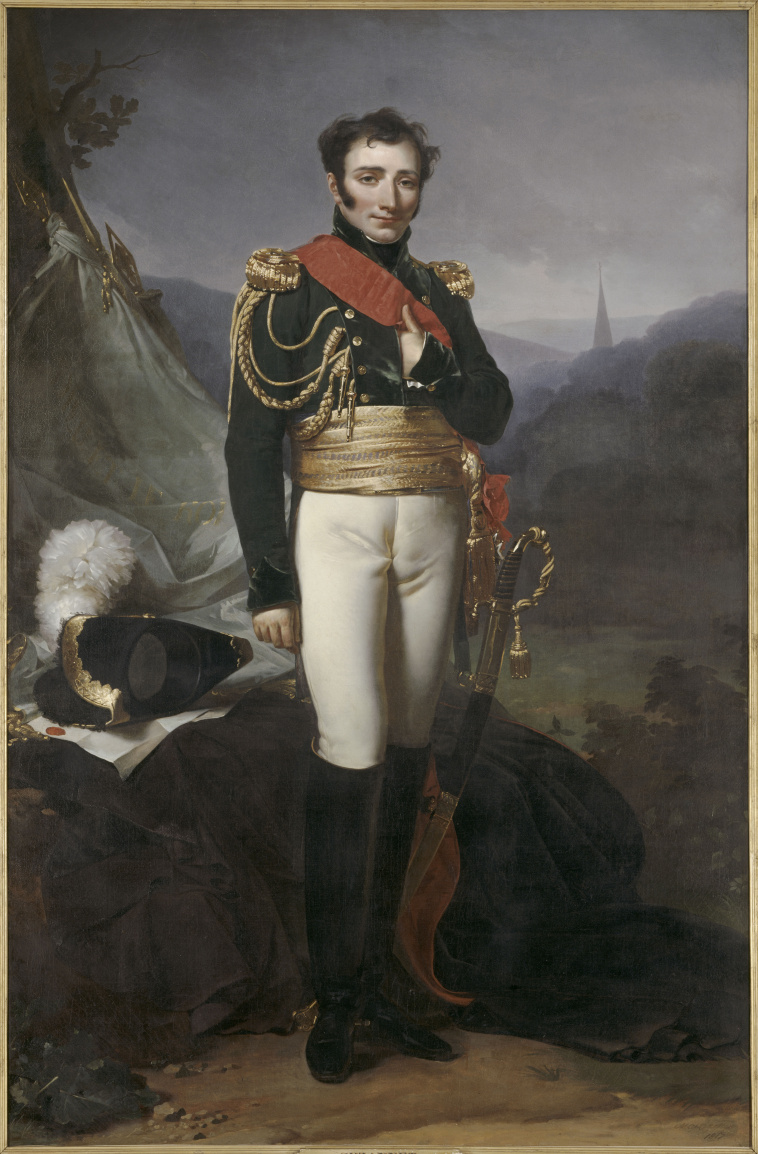
The Count of Suzannet, portrait by Jean-Baptiste Mauzaisse

Jean Baptiste Pierre Constant de Suzannet, Count de Suzannet (French pronunciation: [ʒɑ̃ batist pjɛʁ kɔ̃stɑ̃ də syzanɛ]; 13 February 1772 – 21 June 1815) was a French Royalist military officer who fought in the War in the Vendée.

== Early life ==
He was born in the master bedroom of the family manor house, the Château la Chardière, in Chavagnes-en-Paillers. His family had been residing there for generations and a descendant now owns the house. During his early years, he developed a liking for traditional country pursuits, such as riding and hunting.

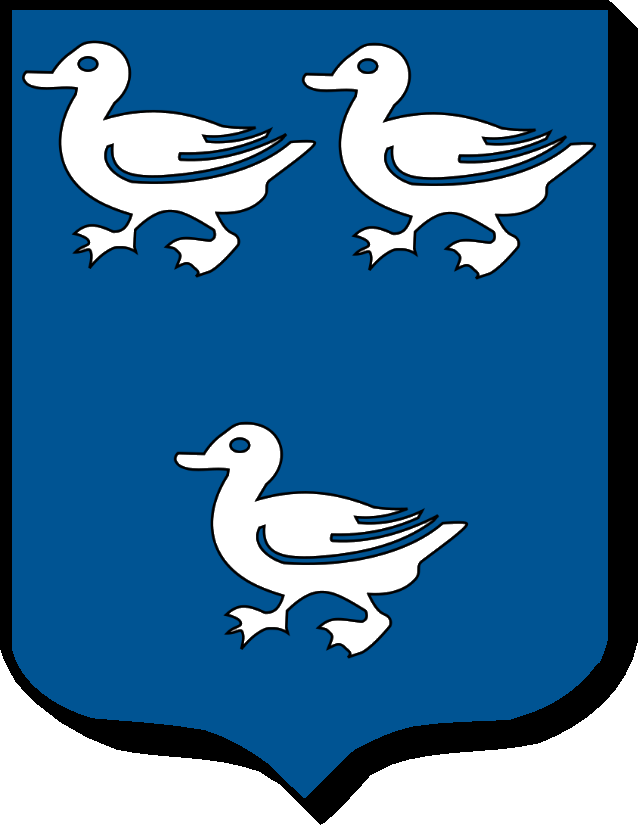
Coat of Arms of the de Suzannet family

== Military career ==
Because of the political and social instability caused by the French Revolution, Suzannet emigrated to Britain in 1792, but he returned to France in 1795, following the landing at Quiberon, to fight with the Catholic and Royal Army. When he arrived, he was placed under the command of François de Charette.

Charette was captured and executed in 1796, Suzannet succeeded as head of the Army of Lower Poitou during the insurrection of 1799.

Napoleon Bonaparte's return to Paris from exile on the Isle of Elba in 1815 caused a change of government that the people from the Vendée were reluctant to accept. The vast majority of the people in the area -including Suzannet himself- were deeply royalist. On June 20, 1815, at the Battle of Rocheserviere, Pierre de Suzannet was badly injured fighting for King Louis XVIII against loyal Napoleonic troops of the Hundred Days. As a result of his horrible injuries, the Comte de Suzannet died the next day at Aigrefeuille-sur-Maine.
