= Saint-André-Treize-Voies =

- Part of Montréverd
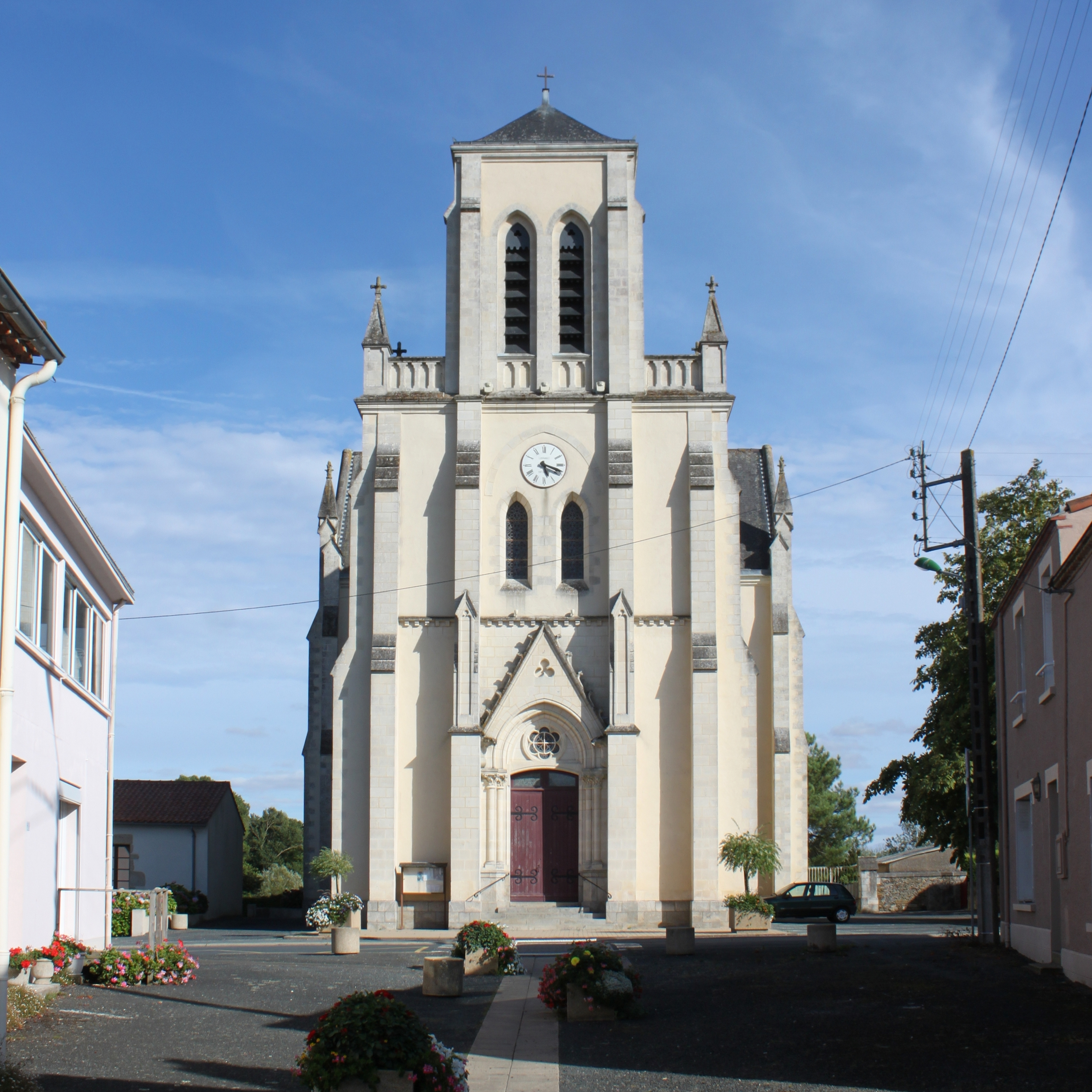
- The church in Saint-André-Treize-Voies
- Location of Saint-André-Treize-Voies
- Location within France Location within Pays de la Loire
- Coordinates: 46°56′07″N 1°24′39″W
- Country: France
- Region: Pays de la Loire
- Department: Vendée
- Arrondissement: La Roche-sur-Yon
- Canton: Aizenay
- Commune: Montréverd
- Area^{1}: 18.96 km^{2} (7.32 sq mi)
- Highest elevation: 69 m (226 ft)
- Lowest elevation: 33 m (108 ft)
- Population (2022): 1,484
  - Density: 78.27/km^{2} (202.7/sq mi)
- Time zone: UTC+01:00 (CET)
  - Summer (DST): UTC+02:00 (CEST)
- Postal code: 85260
- ^{1} French Land Register data, which excludes lakes, ponds, glaciers > 1 km^{2} (0.386 sq mi or 247 acres) and river estuaries.

Saint-André-Treize-Voies (French pronunciation: [sɛ̃t‿ɑ̃dʁe tʁɛz vwa]) is a former commune in the Vendée department in the Pays de la Loire region in western France. On 1 January 2016, it was merged into the new commune of Montréverd.

== See also ==
- Communes of the Vendée department
