= Charles Marie de Beaumont d'Autichamp =

French general (1770–1859)

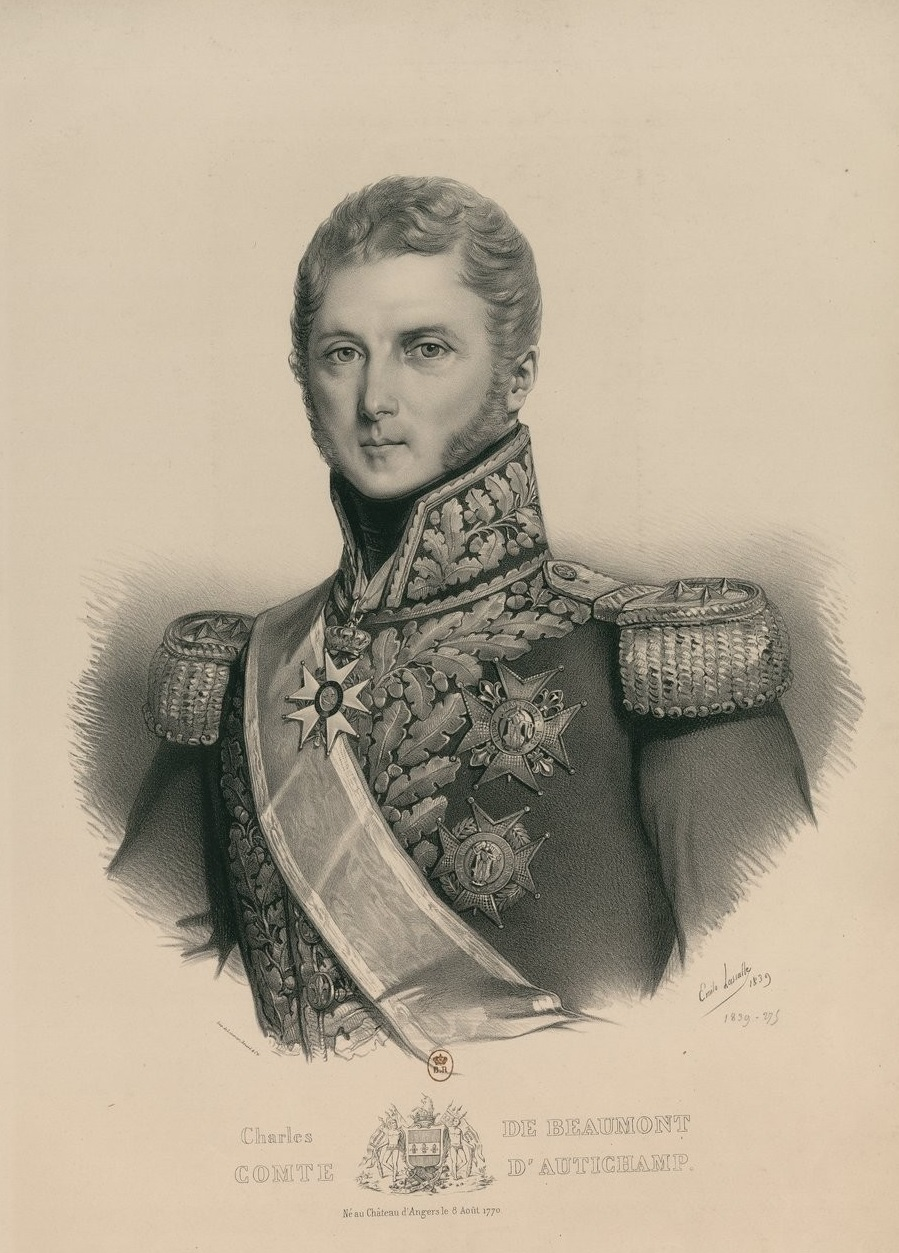
- Born: 8 August 1770; Angers, France
- Died: 6 October 1859 (aged 89); Lhoumois, France
- Military career
- Allegiance: Kingdom of France
- Conflicts: War in the Vendée; Siege of Nantes; Battle of Chantonnay

Charles Marie Auguste Joseph de Beaumont, comte d'Autichamp (French pronunciation: [ʃaʁl maʁi oɡyst ʒozɛf də bomɔ̃ kɔ̃t dotiʃɑ̃]; 8 August 1770 – 6 October 1859, La Rochefaton). He was one of the few Royalist survivors of the War in the Vendée.

== Life ==
=== Revolution ===
A captain in the régiment de Condé in 1789, the comte d'Autichamp emigrated then returned to France and was admitted to the Garde constitutionnelle du Roi. Although the latter was dissolved, on 5 June 1792, he continued to serve and escaped being murdered at the massacre of 10 August 1792. Taking refuge in Anjou in the house of his cousin and brother-in-law, Charles Melchior Artus de Bonchamps, he became one of the leaders of the Vendeen revolt, participating in the Siege of Nantes in June 1793, won the Battle of Chantonnay, on 5 September repulsed Louis Marie Turreau at Les Ponts-de-Cé, on 12 September. After the defeats at Cholet and Beaupréau, he captured the bridge across the Loire at Varades, allowing the Vendéens to cross and take Ancenis.

After the death of the marquis de Bonchamps, he commanded one of the columns which tried in vain to take Granville, on 14 October. Captured at the battle of Le Mans, he managed to escape with help from the hussards in the Republican division of Tilly who gave him a hussard uniform. Freed after the pacification of Saint-Florent, he took up arms again under Nicolas Stofflet and, after Stofflet was killed, took over as head of the remains of the royalist army of Anjou and Haut Poitou. Conscious of his troops' weakness and disorganisation, he then negotiated with Lazare Hoche in May 1796. When peace returned, he spent some time in Paris then had to hide, since he fell under the law of hostages. Although favouring peace at the La Jonchere discussions, he resumed the war in 1799, failed before Cholet and was beaten at Les Aubiers.

=== Post-Revolution ===
The comte d'Autichamp submitted on 18 January 1800 and went into retirement until the fall of the First Empire. During the Hundred Days, he raised a small army of Vendéens and took Cholet without a fight, but was beaten at the Battle of Rocheservière, on 19 and 20 June 1815.

Made a peer of France and inspector general of the infantry by Louis XVIII, the comte d'Autichamp retired on the accession of Louis Philippe I. He favoured the Legitimist insurrection of the Duchesse de Berry in 1832, leading to his exile for seven years.

He lived out his last years in Lhoumois and died on 6 October 1859.
