= Battle of Rocheserviere =

Rebellion during Hundred Days

- Part of the Hundred Days
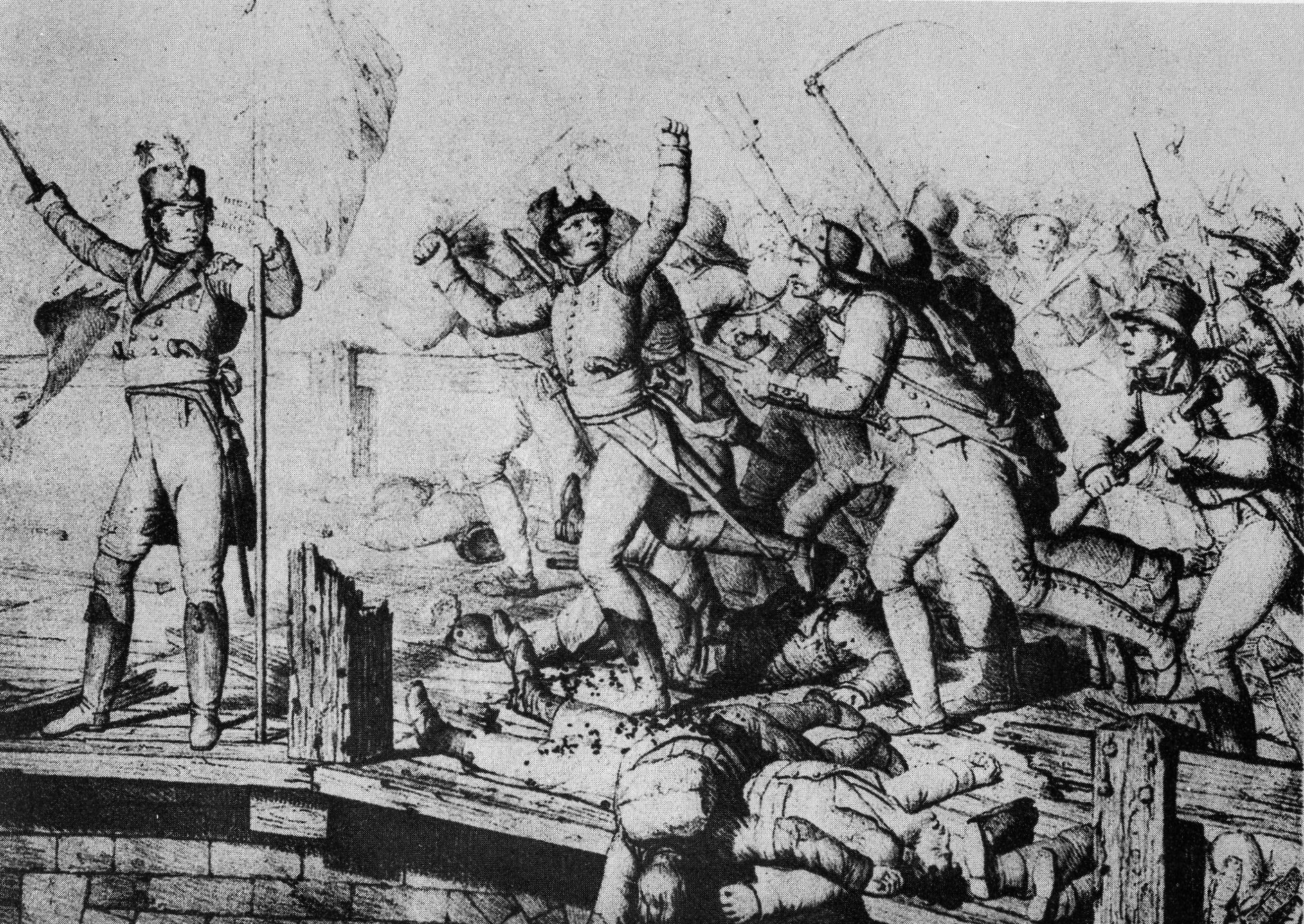
- A scene from the Battle of Rochesevière
Date	20 June 1815
Location	Rocheservière 46°56′23″N 1°30′29″W
Result	Bonapartist victory

Belligerents
(First French Empire) French Empire	(Bourbon Restoration in France) Kingdom of France

Commanders and leaders
(First French Empire) Jean Maximilien Lamarque (First French Empire) Jean-Pierre Travot	(Bourbon Restoration in France) Pierre Constant Suzannet (DOW) (Bourbon Restoration in France) Charles Autichamp

Strength
c. 6,000 Bonapartists	c. 8,000 Vendeans

Casualties and losses
10 killed 60 wounded	100 killed 500 wounded

The Battle of Rocheserviere was fought at Rocheservière on the 20 June 1815, between Vendéan Royalists, who had remained loyal to King Louis XVIII during the Hundred Days, and Napoleon's Army of the West, commanded by General Jean Maximilien Lamarque. The battle ended with the defeat of the Royalist forces. Five days later the Treaty of Cholet was signed, ending the hostilities.

== Background ==
The Army of the West had been formed to pacify the region and support the new French government instigated by Napoleon Bonaparte after his return to Paris at the start of the Hundred Days in 1815. While Napoleon marched north to deal with the threat from the British and Prussian armies during the Waterloo campaign, Lamarque was sent to pacify the Royalist stronghold of the Vendée. Assisted by Michel Silvestre Brayer, he left Nantes with 3000 men on 11 June. By the 17th, his force had increased to 6000 men. He soon learned that a Vendean army of around 8000 men under Charles Autichamp and Pierre Constant Suzannet was concentrating in the vicinity of Rocheservière.

== Battle ==
The Vendée Royalist forces were well protected in defensive positions, but were divided into separate armies. Suzannet occupied the heights of Rocheservière, protected to the west by the Boulogne river, which was difficult for an army to cross. Another force under Bertrand Saint-Hubert was in Saint-André-Treize-Voies, nine kilometers east of Rocheservière. As for Charles Autichamp, he was positioned Vieillevigne north-east, 7 kilometers from Rocheservière and 4 km from Saint-André.

These positions would be difficult for the Bonapartists to attack, but on 19 June Suzannet's force suddenly withdrew from Rocheservière and occupied Mormaison to the south east. The Bonapartists took the opportunity to launch an attack on the Vendeans. The chasseurs under Jean-Pierre Travot clashed with the Vendeans at La Grolle between Rocheservière and Saint-André. However Suzannet's cavalry were sent in, forcing Travot to retreat. Suzannet then brought all his troops up to La Grolle.

The next day, 20 June, Suzannet decided to meet the Bonapartists in battle. He wrote to Autichamp, the commander in chief, asking him to join him, but Autichamp refused to move immediately saying he was securing his position. Suzannet and Saint-Hubert then crossed the Boulogne river and marched to meet the Bonapartists. The two armies met on the moors of the Grand-Collet, South West of Rocheservière. The separate forces of Saint-Hubert and Suzannet were at some distance from each other. The Bonapartists under Travot first entered into contact with the forces of Saint-Hubert. Saint-Hubert's men were taken in the flank by Travot's chasseurs, and were routed. Suzannet arrived too late to retrieve the situation. Seeing the rout of Saint-Hubert, he launched a desperate charge at the Bonapartist lines. In the ensuing fight Suzannet collapsed, seriously wounded by a bullet. Lamarque then ordered his cavalry to attack, and Suzannet's forces broke and fled the field.

At Vieillevigne, General Autichamp was informed of the fighting at Grand-Collet. He immediately marched towards Rocheservière, but only arrived in time to witness the rout of Suzannet and Saint-Hubert. Autichamp then decided to place his men in defense of the bridge over the Boulogne. But Lamarque forded the river, taking Rocheservière, and moved round behind the Vendeans. They panicked and fled, falling back in disorder to the north of Clisson. The next day General Suzannet died of his injuries at Aigrefeuille-sur-Maine.

== Aftermath ==
Though the battle was fought two days after Napoleon's decisive defeat at Waterloo, neither side was aware of this. The first information to emerge about the wider military situation was news of Napoleon's victory at the Battle of Ligny. This led to attempts on the part of the Royalists to negotiate with Lamarque. A treaty was signed five days after the battle, in which the Vendean Royalists agreed to cease operations. When news came through shortly afterwards of Napoleon's defeat, Lamarque convinced the Royalists not to exploit the situation but to allow the area to be occupied by the advancing Prussian troops.

== See also ==
- Minor campaigns of 1815: La Vendée

== Further read ==
- Chandler, David (1979). Dictionary of the Napoleonic Wars. London : Arms and Armour Press. ISBN 9780853683537.

Preceded by Battle of Wavre	Napoleonic Wars; Battle of Rocheserviere	Succeeded by Battle of La Suffel
