= Rocheservière =

- Commune
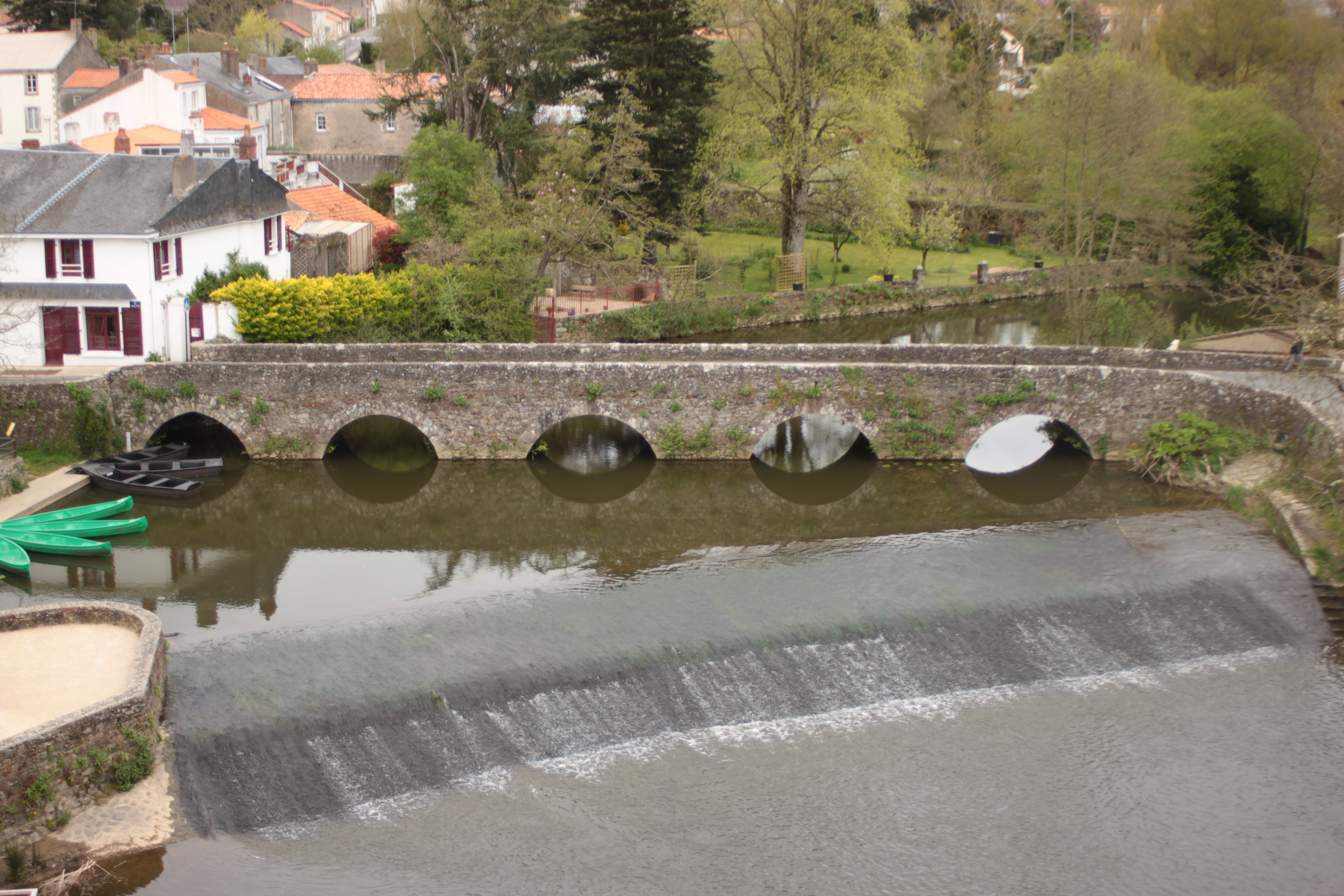
- The Gallo-Roman bridge in Rocheserviere

- Coat of arms
- Location of Rocheservière
- Location within France Location within Pays de la Loire
- Coordinates: 46°56′23″N 1°30′29″W
- Country: France
- Region: Pays de la Loire
- Department: Vendée
- Arrondissement: La Roche-sur-Yon
- Canton: Aizenay
- Intercommunality: CA Terres de Montaigu

Government
  - Mayor (2020–2026): Bernard Dabreteau
- Area^{1}: 28.15 km^{2} (10.87 sq mi)
- Highest elevation: 72 m (236 ft)
- Lowest elevation: 15 m (49 ft)
- Population (2023): 3,594
  - Density: 127.7/km^{2} (330.7/sq mi)
- Time zone: UTC+01:00 (CET)
  - Summer (DST): UTC+02:00 (CEST)
- INSEE/Postal code: 85190 /85620
- ^{1} French Land Register data, which excludes lakes, ponds, glaciers > 1 km^{2} (0.386 sq mi or 247 acres) and river estuaries.

Rocheservière (French pronunciation: [ʁɔʃsɛʁvjɛʁ]) is a commune in the Vendée department in the Pays de la Loire region in western France. The Battle of Rocheservière was fought nearby in 1815.

== Geography ==
=== Climate ===
Rocheservière has an oceanic climate (Köppen climate classification Cfb). The average annual temperature in Rocheservière is 12.4 °C (54.3 °F). The average annual rainfall is 831.3 mm (32.73 in) with December as the wettest month. The temperatures are highest on average in July, at around 19.6 °C (67.3 °F), and lowest in January, at around 6.1 °C (43.0 °F). The highest temperature ever recorded in Rocheservière was 41.8 °C (107.2 °F) on 18 July 2022; the coldest temperature ever recorded was −17.0 °C (1.4 °F) on 10 February 1986.

Climate data for Rocheservière (1991−2020 normals, extremes 1985−present)
| Month | Jan | Feb | Mar | Apr | May | Jun | Jul | Aug | Sep | Oct | Nov | Dec | Year |
|---|---|---|---|---|---|---|---|---|---|---|---|---|---|
| Record high °C (°F) | 17.0 (62.6) | 22.4 (72.3) | 24.0 (75.2) | 27.8 (82.0) | 32.1 (89.8) | 39.6 (103.3) | 41.8 (107.2) | 39.5 (103.1) | 34.2 (93.6) | 31.2 (88.2) | 21.7 (71.1) | 18.5 (65.3) | 41.8 (107.2) |
| Mean daily maximum °C (°F) | 9.4 (48.9) | 10.5 (50.9) | 13.5 (56.3) | 16.3 (61.3) | 20.0 (68.0) | 23.6 (74.5) | 25.8 (78.4) | 26.0 (78.8) | 22.8 (73.0) | 17.9 (64.2) | 12.9 (55.2) | 9.9 (49.8) | 17.4 (63.3) |
| Daily mean °C (°F) | 6.1 (43.0) | 6.4 (43.5) | 8.7 (47.7) | 10.9 (51.6) | 14.5 (58.1) | 17.7 (63.9) | 19.6 (67.3) | 19.6 (67.3) | 16.7 (62.1) | 13.4 (56.1) | 9.2 (48.6) | 6.6 (43.9) | 12.4 (54.3) |
| Mean daily minimum °C (°F) | 2.9 (37.2) | 2.2 (36.0) | 3.9 (39.0) | 5.4 (41.7) | 8.9 (48.0) | 11.9 (53.4) | 13.4 (56.1) | 13.2 (55.8) | 10.5 (50.9) | 8.9 (48.0) | 5.5 (41.9) | 3.3 (37.9) | 7.5 (45.5) |
| Record low °C (°F) | −13.0 (8.6) | −17.0 (1.4) | −10.2 (13.6) | −4.5 (23.9) | −0.7 (30.7) | 3.0 (37.4) | 5.5 (41.9) | 3.0 (37.4) | 1.6 (34.9) | −4.4 (24.1) | −7.6 (18.3) | −9.6 (14.7) | −17.0 (1.4) |
| Average precipitation mm (inches) | 88.4 (3.48) | 66.0 (2.60) | 61.0 (2.40) | 62.3 (2.45) | 57.3 (2.26) | 44.8 (1.76) | 48.0 (1.89) | 48.0 (1.89) | 67.1 (2.64) | 90.0 (3.54) | 96.1 (3.78) | 102.3 (4.03) | 831.3 (32.73) |
| Average precipitation days (≥ 1.0 mm) | 13.1 | 10.5 | 9.7 | 9.8 | 9.2 | 7.7 | 7.5 | 6.9 | 7.9 | 11.4 | 13.0 | 13.7 | 120.3 |
Source: Météo-France

== Population ==
Historical population
| Year | Pop. | ±% p.a. |
|---|---|---|
| 1968 | 1,774 | — |
| 1975 | 1,948 | +1.35% |
| 1982 | 2,182 | +1.63% |
| 1990 | 2,245 | +0.36% |
| 1999 | 2,241 | −0.02% |
| 2007 | 2,789 | +2.77% |
| 2012 | 3,068 | +1.93% |
| 2017 | 3,322 | +1.60% |
| 2023 | 3,594 | +1.32% |
Source: INSEE

== See also ==
- Communes of the Vendée department
