= Bellevigny =

- Commune
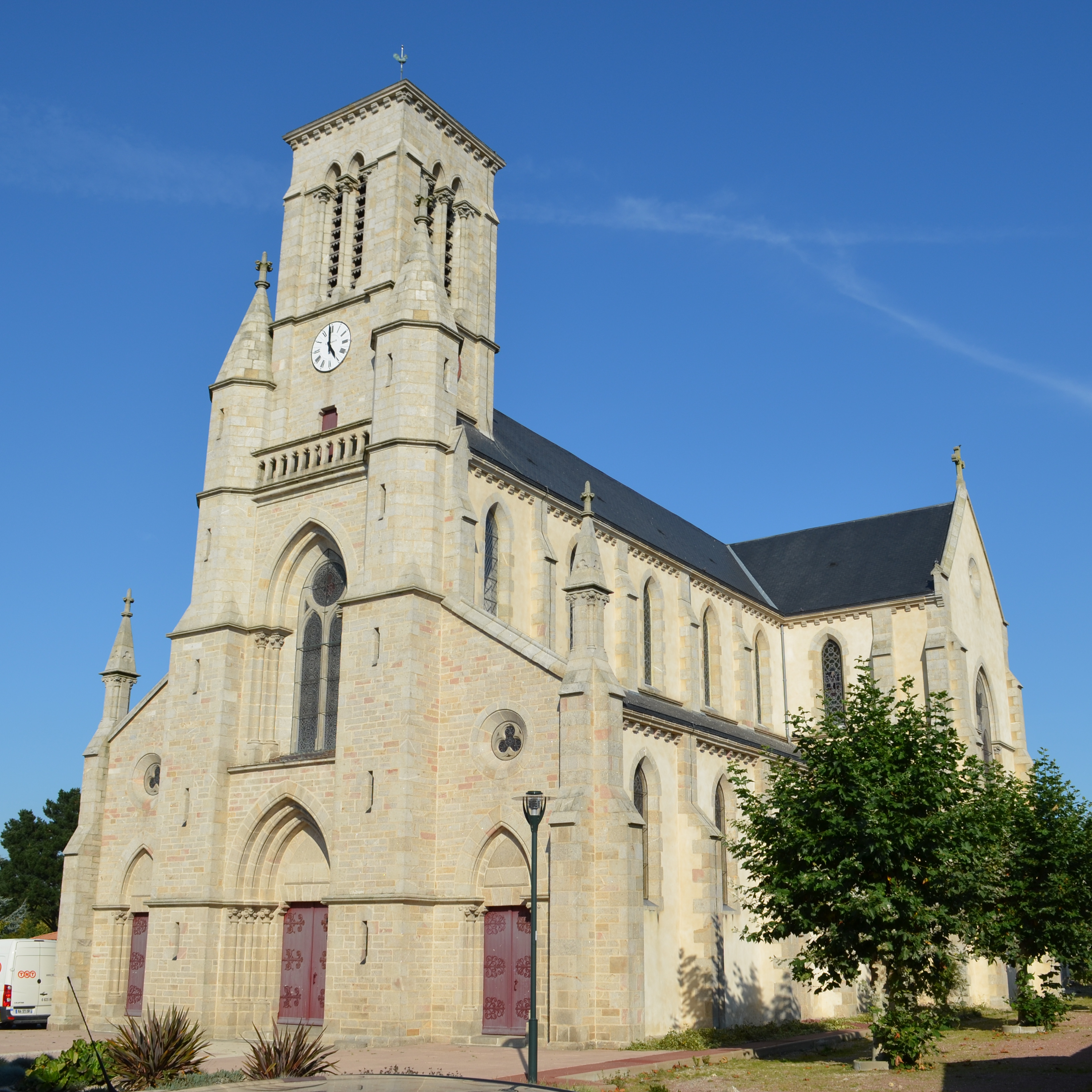
- Location of Bellevigny
- Location within France Location within Pays de la Loire
- Coordinates: 46°46′59″N 1°25′48″W
- Country: France
- Region: Pays de la Loire
- Department: Vendée
- Arrondissement: La Roche-sur-Yon
- Canton: Aizenay

Government
  - Mayor (2023–2026): Philippe Briaud
- Area^{1}: 38.52 km^{2} (14.87 sq mi)
- Population (2023): 6,240
  - Density: 162/km^{2} (420/sq mi)
- Time zone: UTC+01:00 (CET)
  - Summer (DST): UTC+02:00 (CEST)
- INSEE/Postal code: 85019 /85170
- ^{1} French Land Register data, which excludes lakes, ponds, glaciers > 1 km^{2} (0.386 sq mi or 247 acres) and river estuaries.

Bellevigny is a commune in the department of Vendée, western France. The municipality was established on 1 January 2016 by merger of the former communes of Belleville-sur-Vie and Saligny.

== Population ==
Population data refer to the area corresponding with the commune as of January 2025.

Historical population
Year	Pop.	±% p.a.
1968	2,143	—
1975	2,395	+1.60%
1982	3,108	+3.79%
1990	3,565	+1.73%
1999	4,154	+1.71%
2007	5,207	+2.86%
2012	5,735	+1.95%
2017	6,005	+0.92%
2023	6,240	+0.64%
Source: INSEE

== Economy ==
The Dubreuil Group and subsidiary French Bee (formerly French Blue) have their head offices in the Belleville-sur-Vie area of Bellevigny.

== Education ==
Public schools:

- École publique Les Chaumes (Belleville-sur-Vie) - preschool and elementary school
- École publique Sablier du Frêne (Saligny)
- Collège Antoine de Saint-Exupery (Belleville-sur-Vie) - junior high school

Private schools (both primary schools):

- École Primaire Privée Saint Augustin (Belleville-sur-Vie)
- École Primaire Privée Sacré Cœur (Saligny)

The commune has a library in Saligny and media centre in Belleville-sur-Vie.

== See also ==
- Communes of the Vendée department
