= La Genétouze, Vendée =

La Genétouze
- Commune
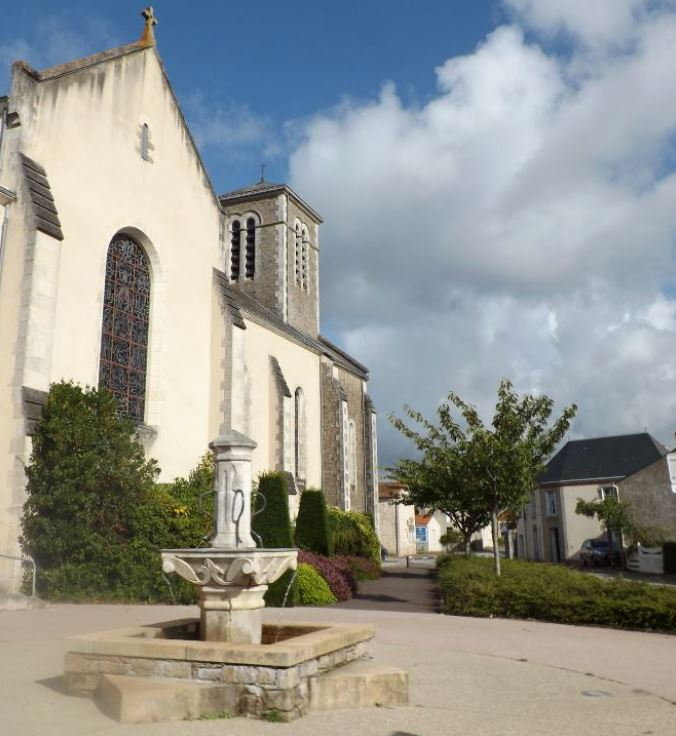
- The church of Our Lady of the Assumption, in the centre of the village

- Coat of arms
- Location of La Genétouze
- Location within France Location within Pays de la Loire
- Coordinates: 46°43′40″N 1°30′42″W
- Country: France
- Region: Pays de la Loire
- Department: Vendée
- Arrondissement: La Roche-sur-Yon
- Canton: Aizenay
- Intercommunality: Vie et Boulogne

Government
  - Mayor (2020–2026): Guy Plissonneau
- Area^{1}: 13.12 km^{2} (5.07 sq mi)
- Highest elevation: 81 m (266 ft)
- Lowest elevation: 56 m (184 ft)
- Population (2023): 2,011
  - Density: 153.3/km^{2} (397.0/sq mi)
- Time zone: UTC+01:00 (CET)
  - Summer (DST): UTC+02:00 (CEST)
- INSEE/Postal code: 85098 /85190
- ^{1} French Land Register data, which excludes lakes, ponds, glaciers > 1 km^{2} (0.386 sq mi or 247 acres) and river estuaries.

La Genétouze (French pronunciation: [la ʒənetuz]; before 2017: La Génétouze) is a commune in the Vendée department in the Pays de la Loire region in western France.

== Population ==
Historical population
Year	Pop.	±% p.a.
1968	619	—
1975	762	+3.01%
1982	1,125	+5.72%
1990	1,319	+2.01%
1999	1,393	+0.61%
2007	1,569	+1.50%
2012	1,775	+2.50%
2017	1,931	+1.70%
2023	2,011	+0.68%
Source: INSEE

== See also ==
- Communes of the Vendée department
