= War in the Vendée =

1793–1796 set of battles between the French revolutionaries and the royalists

- Part of the War of the First Coalition and the French Revolutionary Wars
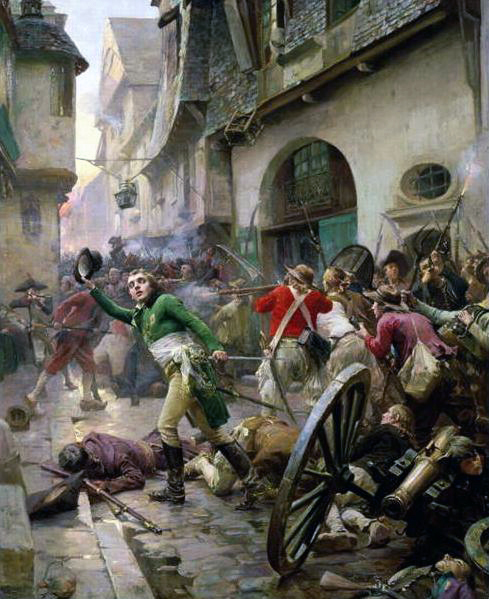
- Henri de La Rochejaquelein at the Battle of Cholet in 1793, by Paul-Émile Boutigny
Date	1793–1796
Location	West France: Maine-et-Loire, Vendée, Loire-Atlantique, Deux-Sèvres (or former provinces of Anjou, Poitou, Brittany)
Result	French Republican victory

Belligerents
(France) French Republic	Vendeans

Commanders and leaders
(France) Jean Baptiste Camille Canclaux; (France) Armand Louis de Gontaut (executed); (France) Jean Antoine Rossignol; (France) François Séverin Marceau; (France) Jean-Baptiste Kléber; (France) François Joseph Westermann; (France) Jean Baptiste Carrier; (France) René François Lecomte †; (France) Jean Léchelle †; (France) Louis Marie Turreau; (France) Thomas-Alexandre Dumas; (France) Lazare Hoche; (France) Pierre Augereau	Jacques Cathelineau †; Maurice d'Elbée (executed); Charles de Bonchamps †; Louis Marie de Lescure †; Henri de la Rochejaquelein †; François de Charette (executed); Jean-Nicolas Stofflet (executed); Charles de Beaumont d'Autichamp; Charles Aimé de Royrand †; Georges Cadoudal

Strength
130,000–150,000	80,000

Casualties and losses
c. 30,000 military killed	Several tens of thousands killed
- Inhabitants of the Vendee: c. 170,000 military and civilians killed; c. 200,000 dead in total

The War in the Vendée (French: Guerre de Vendée [ɡɛʁ də vɑ̃de]) was a counter-revolutionary insurrection that took place in the Vendée region of France from 1793 to 1796, during the French Revolution. The Vendée is a coastal region, located immediately south of the river Loire in western France. Initially, the revolt was similar to the 14th-century Jacquerie peasant uprising, but the Vendée quickly became counter-revolutionary and Royalist. The revolt was comparable to the Chouannerie, which took place concurrently (1794–1800) in the area north of the Loire.

While elsewhere in France the revolts against the levée en masse were repressed, an insurgent territory, called the Vendée militaire by historians, formed south of the Loire-Inférieure (Brittany), south-west of Maine-et-Loire (Anjou), north of Vendée and north-west of Deux-Sèvres (Poitou). Gradually referred to as the "Vendeans", the insurgents established a "Catholic and Royal Army," which won a succession of victories in the spring and summer of 1793. The rebels briefly overran the towns of Fontenay-le-Comte, Thouars, Saumur and Angers, but were halted at the Battle of Nantes.

During autumn, the arrival of the Army of Mainz as reinforcements restored the advantage to the Republican camp, which in October seized Cholet, the most important city controlled by the Vendeans. After this defeat, the bulk of the Vendée forces crossed the Loire and marched to Normandy in a desperate attempt to take a port to obtain the help of the British and the Armée des Émigrés. Pushed back to Granville, the Vendée army was finally destroyed in December at Mans and Savenay. From the winter of 1793 to the spring of 1794, during the Reign of Terror, violent repression was put in place by the Republican forces. In the cities, and in particular in Nantes and Angers, around 15,000 people were shot, drowned or guillotined on the orders of the représentants en mission and Revolutionary Military Commissions; while in the countryside about 20,000 to 50,000 civilians were massacred by the infernal columns, who set fire to many towns and villages.

The repression provoked a resurgence of the rebellion. In December 1794, the Republicans began negotiations which led, between February and May 1795, to the signing of peace treaties with the various Vendée leaders, thus bringing about the end of the "first Vendée war". A "second Vendée war" broke out shortly afterwards, in June 1795, after the start of the Quiberon expedition. The uprising quickly ran out of steam, and the last Vendée leaders submitted or were executed between January and July 1796. The Vendée still experienced brief uprisings, with a third war in 1799, a fourth in 1815, and a fifth in 1832, but these were on a much smaller scale. The number of victims is estimated at 200,000 dead, including approximately 170,000 for the inhabitants of the military Vendée, i.e. between 20 and 25% of the population of the insurgent territory.

== Background ==
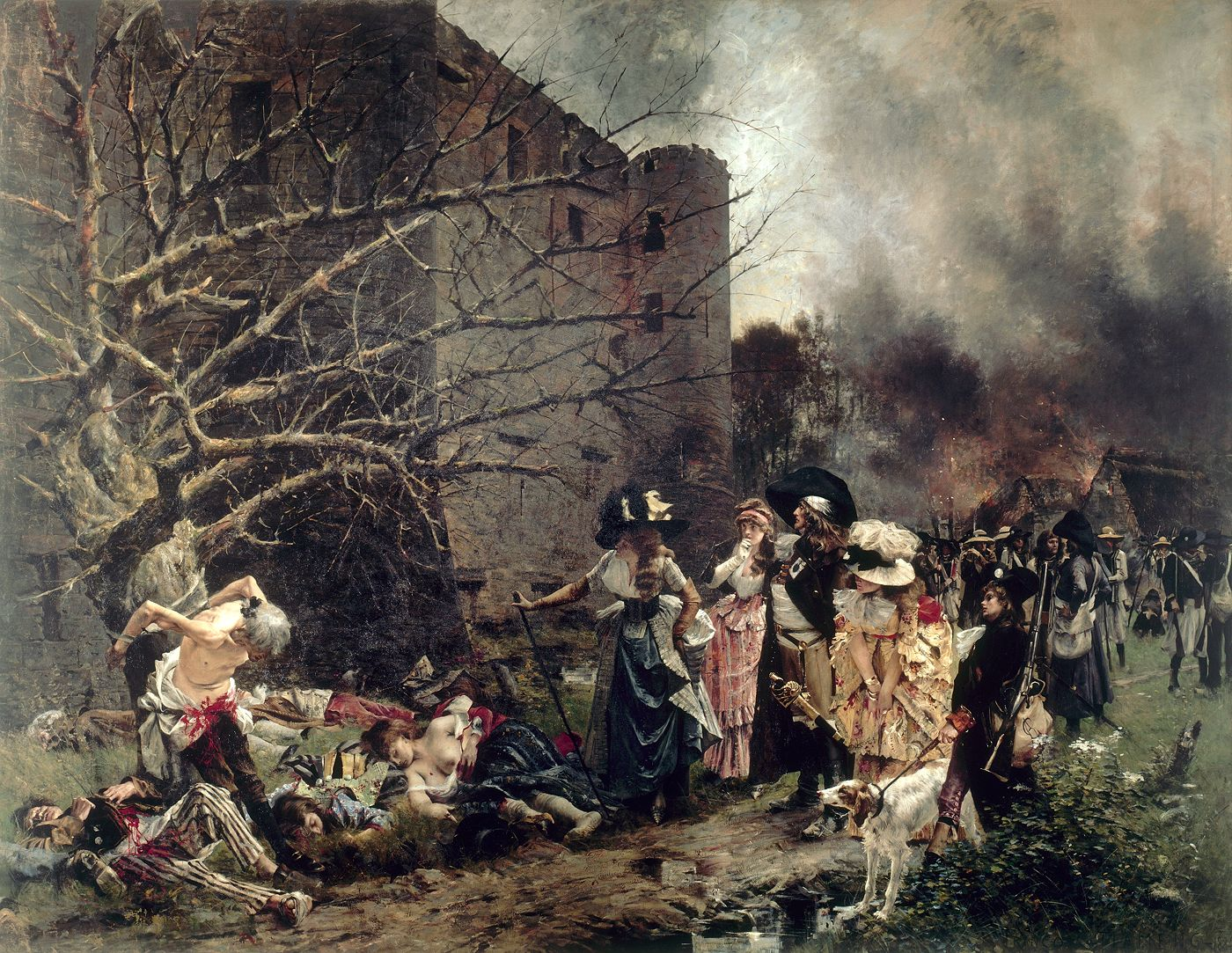
The massacre of 150 to 200 Vendean Republicans by Vendean Royalists in Machecoul was the starting event of the War in the Vendée.

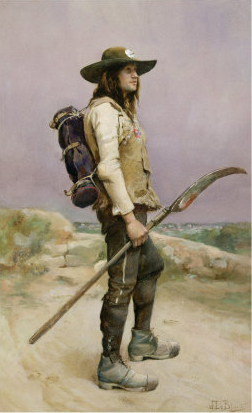
Vendean rebel. Painting by Julien Le Blant

In the rural Vendée, the local nobility seems to have been more permanently in power than in other parts of France. Alexis de Tocqueville noted that most French nobles lived in cities by 1789. An Intendants' survey showed one of the few areas where the nobility still lived with the peasants was the Vendée. In this particularly-isolated feudal stronghold, the class conflict that drove the revolution in Paris and other parts of France was further suppressed by the institutional strength of the Catholic Church in alliance with the nobility. Counter-Enlightenment author Francois Mignet accused militant Republicans of wanting to destroy both the independence and influence of the Catholic Church in France, which the people of the Vendée considered unimaginable.

In 1791, two representatives on mission informed the National Assembly that the Vendée was being mobilized against the French First Republic. This news was swiftly followed by the exposure of an alleged royalist conspiracy organized by the Marquis de la Rouërie. Subsequent defenders of the Vendée rebels argue that this plotting against the Republic was an understandable response to The Terror (a period between 1793 and 1794 where thousands of both real and suspected dissidents were beheaded by guillotine), the Civil Constitution of the Clergy (1790), and the introduction of conscription upon the whole of France, decreed by the National Convention in February 1793.

In what Max Weber later dubbed Caesaropapism, the Civil Constitution of the Clergy required all Roman Catholic priests to transfer their allegiance from the Holy See to the Constitution and, by extension, to the increasingly anti-clerical and anti-Catholic National Constituent Assembly of the Republic. All but seven of the 160 French bishops refused to take the oath, as did about half of the parish priests. Anti-clericalism and coercive secularization of French culture triggered the Vendée belligerence; another trigger was further mass conscription into the French Revolutionary Army. The March 1793 conscription requiring Vendeans to fill their district's quota of the national total of 300,000 enraged the local nobility, clergy, and the populace, who took up arms instead as "The Catholic Army", "Royal" being added later, and fought for "above all the reopening of their parish churches with their former priests."

Although town dwellers were more likely to support the Revolution in the Vendée, there was some support for the Revolution among the rural peasantry. Some Vendean peasants had lived as tenant farmers on Church-owned farmland, and they overwhelmingly embraced the Revolution after all Church lands were seized and redistributed by the Republican government. Counter-Enlightenment historians have argued that local feudalism had primarily protected the peasantry. They cite the fact that over the 100 years of struggle to impose republicanism upon France, the middle class were the primary beneficiaries. Nearly all the purchasers of former Church land were members of the bourgeoisie, and very few peasants benefited from the confiscation and sales.

== Outbreak of revolt ==
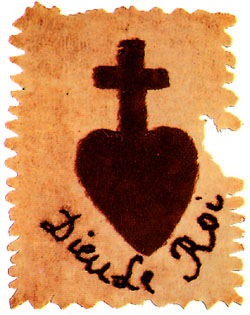
Sacred Heart patch of the Vendean royalist insurgents. The French motto 'Dieu, le Roi' means 'God, the King'.

There were other levy riots across France when regions started to draft men into the army in response to the Levy Decree in February 1793. The reaction in the northwest in early March was particularly pronounced, with large-scale rioting verging on insurrection. By early April, in areas north of the Loire, order had been restored by the revolutionary government. However, south of the Loire, in four departments that became known as the Vendée militaire, there were few troops to control rebels and what had started as rioting quickly became a full insurrection led by priests and the local nobility.

Within a few weeks the Royalist forces had formed a substantial, ill-equipped, army, the Royal and Catholic Army, supported by two thousand irregular cavalry and a few captured artillery pieces. The main force of the Royalists operated on a much smaller scale, using guerrilla tactics, supported by the insurgents' local knowledge and social networks.

=== Geographic coverage ===
The administrative Vendée département (green), the "Military Vendée" (pink) where most of the insurrection took place and the Virée de Galerne (black, red and blue arrows)

Geographically, the insurrection occurred within a rough quadrilateral approximately 60 miles (97 km) wide. The territory defied description in the terms of the redistricting of 1790, nor did it align itself to descriptors used in the Ancien régime; the heart of the movement lay in the forests, with Cholet at its center, in the wild districts of the old county of Anjou, in the Breton marshlands between Montaigu and the sea. It included parts of the old Poitiers and Tours, the départements of Maine-et-Loire, the Vendée, and Deux Sèvres, but never completely fell under Royalist control.

The further the land was from Paris (the seat of revolutionary power), the more counter-revolutionary belligerence occurred.

== Vendée military response ==
The insurrection began in March 1793, as a rejection of the mass conscription edict. In February, the National Convention had voted to approve a levy of three hundred thousand men, to be chosen by lot among the unmarried men in each commune. Thus, the arrival of recruiters reminded locals of the methods of the monarchy, aroused resistance in the countryside, and set in motion the first serious signs of sedition. Much of this opposition was quelled quickly, but in the lower Loire, in the Mauges and in the Vendean bocage, the situation was more serious and more protracted. Youths from communes surrounding Cholet, a large textile town on the boundary between the two regions, invaded the town and killed the commander of the National Guard, a "patriotic" (pro-revolutionary) manufacturer. Within a week, violence had spread to the Breton marshlands; peasants overran the town of Machecoul on 11 March, and several hundred Republican citizens were massacred. A large band of peasants under the leadership of Jacques Cathelineau and Jean-Nicolas Stofflet seized Saint-Florent-le-Vieil on 12 March. By mid-March, a minor revolt against conscription had turned into full-fledged insurrection.

The Republic was quick to respond, dispatching over 45,000 troops to the area. The first pitched battle was on the night of 19 March. A Republican column of 2,000, under general Louis Henri François de Marcé, moving from La Rochelle to Nantes, was intercepted north of Chantonnay near the Gravereau bridge (Saint-Vincent-Sterlanges), over the river le Petit-Lay. After six hours of fighting, rebel reinforcements arrived and routed the Republican forces. In the north, on 22 March, another Republican force was routed near Chalonnes-sur-Loire.

=== Battle of Bressuire ===
There followed a series of skirmishes and armed contacts. On 3 May 1793, Bressuire fell to Vendéen forces led by Henri de la Rochejaquelein.

=== Battle of Thouars ===
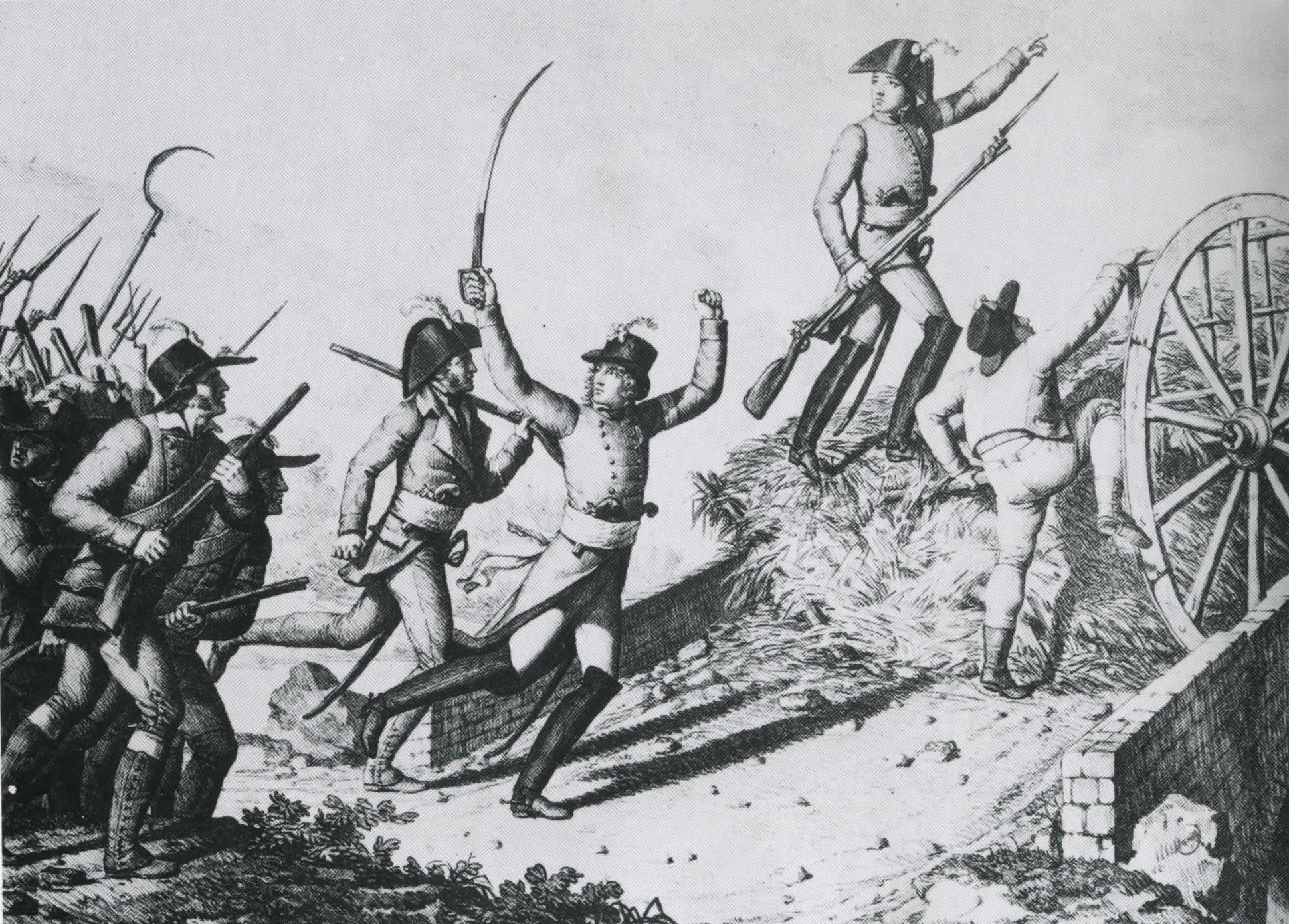
La Rochejaquelein and the Marquis de Lescure leading troops on the pont de Vrine

The Battle of Thouars occurred on 5 May 1793; the main clash took place on the Pont de Vrine, the bridge over the river leading into Thouars. The Vendéens proved unable to take the bridge for six hours, until Louis Marie de Lescure (fighting in his first battle) showed himself alone on the bridge under enemy fire and encouraged his men to follow him, which they did, crossing the bridge. The Republicans there were taken from behind by the cavalry under Charles de Bonchamps, which had crossed the river at a ford. Despite the arrival of reinforcements, the Republicans were routed and withdrew towards the city. The insurgents, headed by Henri de La Rochejacquelein, took the rampart by force and poured into the city, and the Republican troops quickly capitulated. The Vendéens seized a large amount of arms and gunpowder, but allowed the captured Republican forces to leave, after having sworn to no longer fight in the Vendée and had their hair shaved off so they could be recognised lest they went back on their word and were recaptured.

=== Battle of Fontenay-le-Comte ===
On 25 May 1793 the Catholic and royalist army took Fontenay-le-Comte. Lescure led his men in a courageous charge under enemy fire, shouting 'Long live the king!' and braving cannon fire, which left him unharmed. Likewise, La Rochejacquelein wore his distinctive three red handkerchiefs on his head, waist and neck even though the gunners in the Republican forces were aiming for them. Following the victory, his friends decided to copy him by wearing three red handkerchiefs too, so that La Rochejacquelein could not be distinguished by the enemy in the future. After this the only Vendée towns remaining in the control of the Republic were Nantes and Les Sables d'Olonne.

=== Battle of Saumur ===
On 9 June 1793, Vendean insurgents commanded by Jacques Cathelineau captured the town of Saumur from Louis-Alexandre Berthier. The victory gave the insurgents a massive supply of arms, including 50 cannons. This was the high point of the insurgency. The Vendeans had never before attempted to take such a large town, and they captured it in a single day, inflicting heavy losses on its Republican defenders. Many prisoners were taken, some of whom went over to the Vendean cause, while many of the citizens fled to Tours.

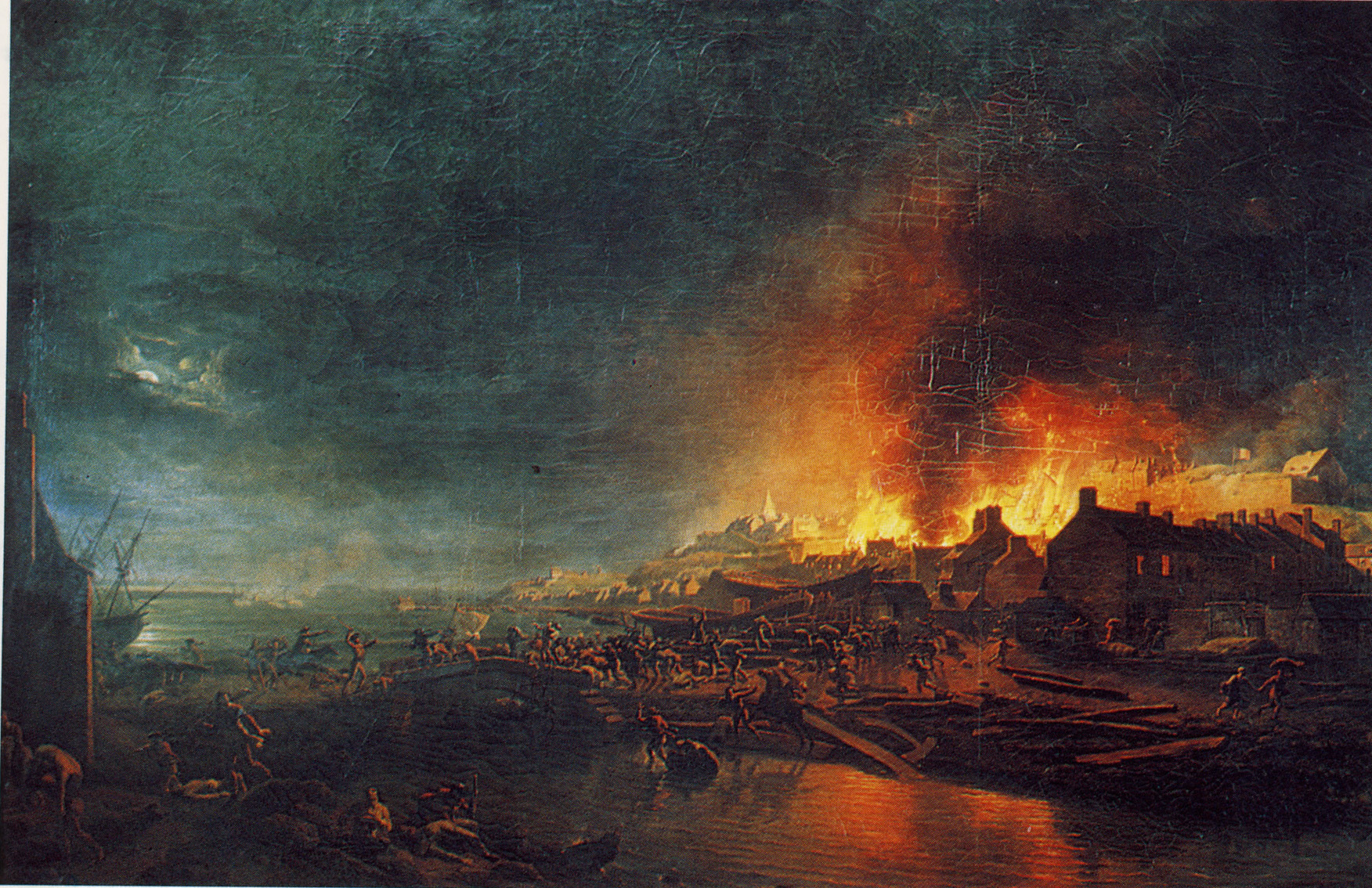
The burning of Granville, 14 November 1793

=== Battle of Nantes ===
On 24 June 1793, the commanders of the Catholic and royalist army issued an ultimatum to the mayor of Nantes, Baco de la Chapelle to surrender the city or they would massacre the garrison. On 29 June, they began an assault with a force of 40,000. Inside the city were Republicans from the surrounding countryside who had fled to Nantes for safety, fortifying the defenders with tales of the horrors that the rebels inflicted on towns they managed to take. Baco de la Chapelle stood on a dustcart that he called the "chariot of victory" to urge the people on, even after he had been wounded in the leg. Poor coordination between the four Vendean armies led by Charette, Bonchamps, Cathelineau and Lyrot hampered the assault, and Cathelineau's forces were delayed in their deployment by fighting along the river Erdre with a Republican battalion. Cathelineau himself was shot at the head of his forces, causing his men to lose heart and retreat; ultimately, the Vendeans were unable to take the city. In October 1793, to punish the Vendean prisoners taken after the failure of the siege of Nantes, Jean-Baptiste Carrier ordered them to be shot en masse. When this proved impractical, he had the prisoners rounded up and put out on the river Loire in boats equipped with trap-door bottoms; when these opened the victims were left to drown. On this occasion it was rumored that female prisoners were stripped and tied up with men before being sent to their deaths, the so-called Republican Marriage. Some later historians dispute this story as a counter-revolutionary myth.

=== First Battle of Châtillon ===
On 5 July 1793, the First Battle of Châtillon took place at Châtillon-sur-Sèvre near the commune of Mauléon. In that action, Marquis de la Rochejaquelein commanding 20,000 Vendean Royalists attacked a French Republican force led by General François Joseph Westermann. The Vendean Royalists were victorious, killing and wounding 5,000 French Republicans. Among those killed in the battle was French Republican General Chambon.

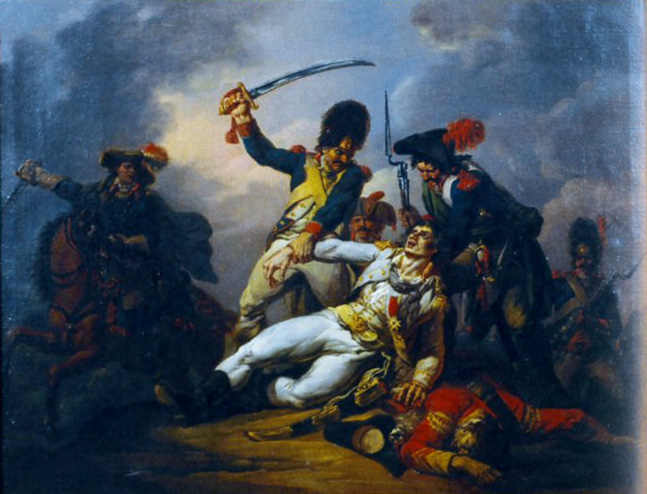
The capture of François de Charette, 1796

=== Battle of Vihiers ===
The Vendeans won a victory over the revolutionary army led by Santerre at the Battle of Vihiers on 18 July 1793.

=== Battle of Luçon ===
The Battle of Luçon was actually a series of three engagements fought over four weeks, the first on 15 July and the last on 14 August 1793, between Republican forces under Augustin Tuncq and Vendean forces. The engagement on 14 August, fought near the town of Luçon was actually the conclusion of three engagements between Maurice d'Elbée's Vendean insurgents and the Republican army. On 15 July, Claude Sandoz and a garrison of 800 had repulsed 5,000 insurgents led by d'Elbee; on 28 July, Tuncq drove off a second attempt; two weeks later, Tuncq and his 5,000 men routed 30,000 insurgents under the personal command of François de Charette.

=== Battle of Montaigu ===
The Battle of Montaigu was fought on 21 September 1793 when the Vendéens attacked general Jean-Michel Beysser's French Republican division. Taken by surprise, this division fought back but lost 400 men, including many captured. Some of these prisoners were summarily executed by the Vendeens and their bodies later found in the castle wells by troops under Jean-Baptiste Kléber.

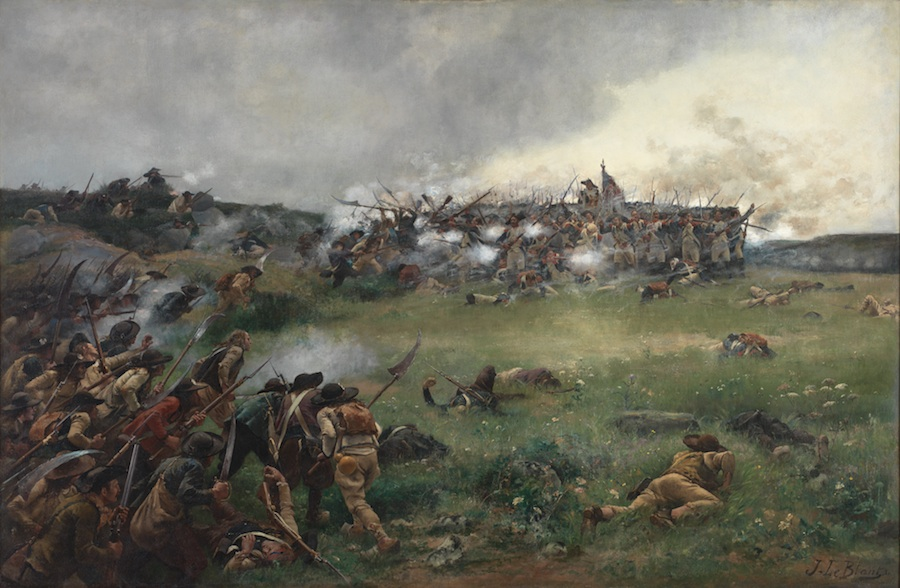
Le Bataillon Carré, a painting depicting an ambush in the War of Vendée

=== Second Battle of Tiffauges ===
The Battle of Tiffauges was fought on 19 September 1793 between Royalist military leaders against Republican troops under Jean-Baptiste Kléber and Canclaux.

=== Second Battle of Châtillon ===
On 11 October 1793, the Second Battle of Châtillon took place at Châtillon-sur-Sèvre near the commune of Mauléon. In that action, a Vendean Royalist force led by Louis Marie de Lescure and Charles de Bonchamps skirmished with a column of French Republican soldiers from the Coasts of La Rochelle Army. The Republican force commanded by Alexis Chalbos was routed by the Vendean Royalists. Later in the evening of the same day, François Joseph Westermann led a Republican raiding party and attacked the Vendean encampment inflicting losses upon the rebel fighters and non-combatants. The next day the Vendean Royalists withdrew toward Mortagne-sur-Sèvre.

=== Battle of Tremblaye ===
The Battle of Tremblaye (15 October 1793) took place near Cholet during the war in the Vendée, and was a Republican victory over the Vendéens. The Vendean leader Lescure was seriously injured in the fighting.

=== Defeat (October–December 1793) ===
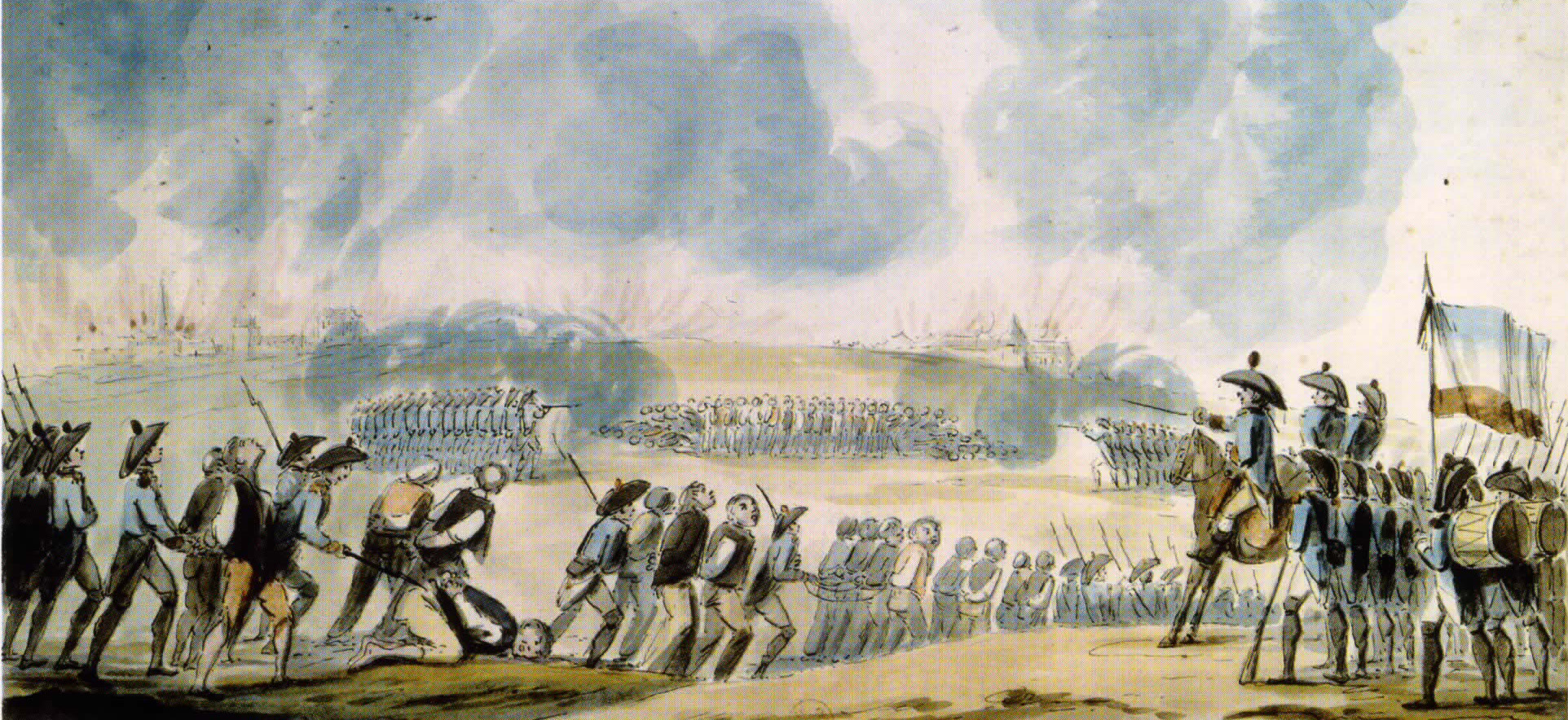
Mass shootings at Nantes, 1793

On 1 August 1793, the Committee of Public Safety ordered Jean-Baptiste Carrier to carry out a "pacification" of the region by complete physical destruction. These orders were not carried out immediately, but a steady stream of demands for total destruction persisted.

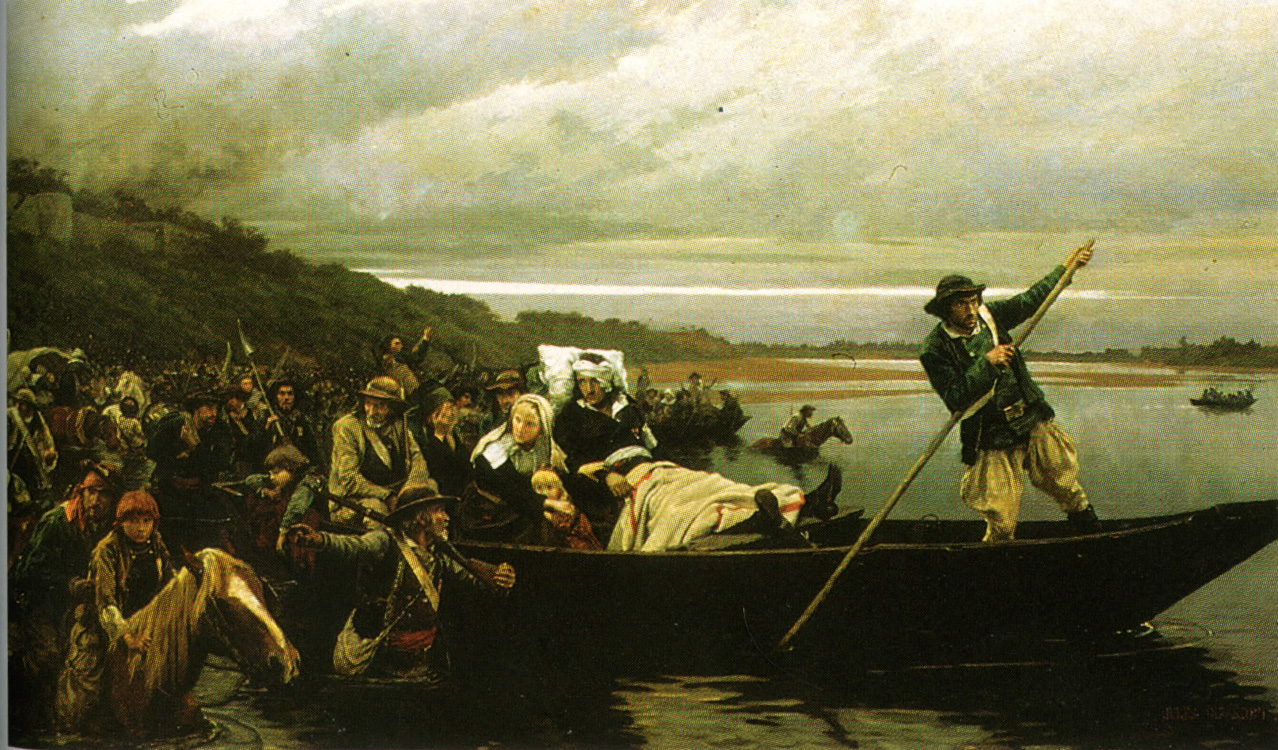
Crossing the Loire: General Lescure, wounded, crosses the Loire at Saint-Florent (17 October 1793), by Jules Girardet

The Republican army was reinforced, benefiting from the first men of the levée en masse and reinforcements from Mainz. The Vendean army had its first serious defeat at the Battle of Cholet on 17 October; worse for the rebels, their army was split. In October 1793 the main force, commanded by Henri de la Rochejaquelein and numbering some 25,000 (followed by thousands of civilians of all ages), crossed the Loire, headed for the port of Granville where they expected to be greeted by a British fleet and an army of exiled French nobles. Arriving at Granville, they found the city surrounded by Republican forces, with no British ships in sight. Their attempts to take the city were unsuccessful. During the retreat, the extended columns fell prey to Republican forces; suffering from hunger and disease, they died in the thousands. The force was defeated in the last, decisive Battle of Savenay on 23 December. Among those executed the following day was lieutenant-general Jacques Alexis de Verteuil, but some historians assert that after the battle of Savenay the rebellion was still going on.

After the Battle of Savenay (December 1793), in a document whose authenticity is disputed, General Westermann reported to his political masters at the convention: "The Vendée is no more ... According to your orders, I have trampled their children beneath our horses' feet; I have massacred their women, so they will no longer give birth to brigands. I do not have a single prisoner to reproach me. I have exterminated them all." Such killing of civilians would have been an explicit violation of the convention's orders to Westermann. Furthermore, several thousand living Vendéan prisoners were being held by Westermann's forces at the time the letter was supposedly written.

== Aftermath of the first war and later revolts ==
With the decisive Battle of Savenay (December 1793) came formal orders for forced evacuation; also, a 'scorched earth' policy was initiated: farms were destroyed, crops and forests burned and villages razed. There were many reported atrocities and a campaign of mass killing universally aimed at residents of the Vendée regardless of combatant status, political affiliation, age or sex. Women of the region were also a specific target, as they were seen as carrying anti-revolutionary babies.

From January to May 1794, 20,000 to 50,000 Vendean civilians were massacred by the colonnes infernales ("infernal columns") of the general Louis Marie Turreau. Among those killed towards the end of the conflict were Blessed Guillaume Repin and 98 other religious figures, many of whom were later beatified by the Catholic Church. In Anjou, directed by Nicolas Hentz and Marie Pierre Adrien Francastel, Republicans captured 11,000 to 15,000 Vendeans, 6,500 to 7,000 were shot or guillotined and 2,000 to 2,200 prisoners died from disease.

Under orders from the Committee of Public Safety in February 1794, the Republican forces launched their final "pacification" effort (named Vendée-Vengé or "Vendée Avenged"): twelve infernal columns under Louis Marie Turreau, marched through the Vendée. General Turreau inquired about "the fate of the women and children I will encounter in rebel territory", stating that, if it was "necessary to pass them all by sword", he would require a decree. In response, the Committee of Public Safety ordered him to "eliminate the brigands to the last man, there is your duty..."

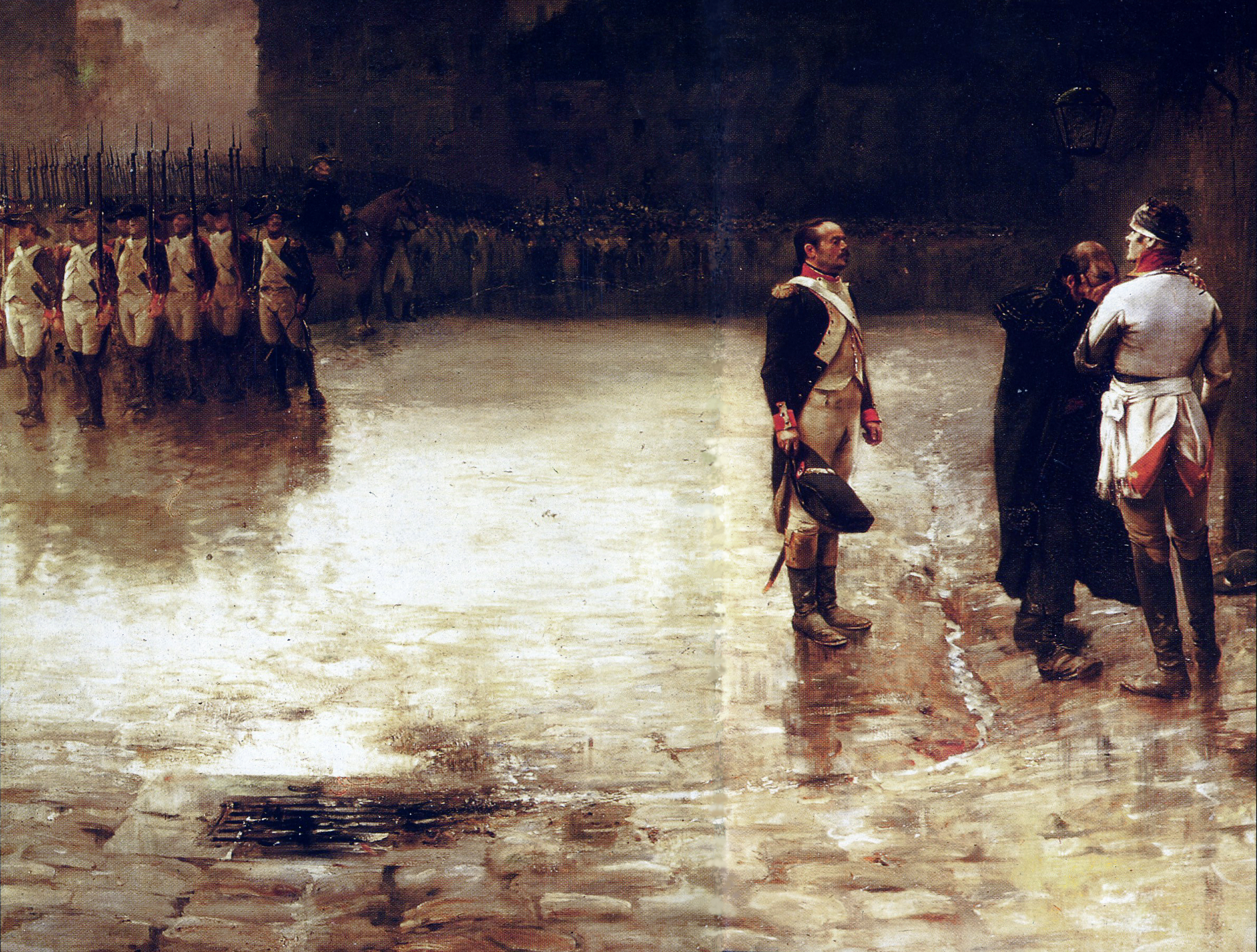
Execution of General Charette, in Nantes, March 1796, by Julien Le Blant, c. 1883

The Convention issued conciliatory proclamations allowing the Vendeans liberty of worship and guaranteeing their property. General Hoche applied these measures with great success. He restored their cattle to the peasants who submitted, "let the priests have a few crowns", and on 20 July 1795 annihilated an émigré expedition which had been equipped in England and had seized Fort Penthièvre and Quiberon. Treaties were concluded at La Jaunaye (15 February 1795) and at La Mabillaie, and were fairly well observed by the Vendeans; no obstacle remained but the feeble and scattered remnant of the Vendeans still under arms and the Chouans. On 16 July 1796, the Directory proclaimed the official end of the war. On 30 July the state of siege was raised in the western departments.

Estimates of those killed in the Vendean conflict—on both sides—range between 117,000 and 450,000, out of a population of around 800,000.

During the time of republican and imperial rule, the department name of Vendée was renamed Venge. Towns and cities were also renamed.

=== The Hundred Days ===
According to Theodore A. Dodge, the war in the Vendée lasted with intensity from 1793 to 1799, when it was suppressed, but later broke out spasmodically especially in 1813, 1814 and 1815. During Napoleon's Hundred Days in 1815, some of the population of the Vendée remained loyal to Louis XVIII, forcing Napoleon – who was short of troops to fight the Waterloo Campaign – to send a force of 10,000 under the command of Jean Maximilien Lamarque to pacify the 8,000 Vendeans led by Pierre Constant Suzannet, which ended with the Battle of Rocheservière.

== Historiography ==
This relatively brief episode in French history has left significant traces on French politics. The Vendée revolt became an immediate symbol of confrontation between revolution and counterrevolution, and a source of unexpurgated violence.

Charles Tilly has claimed that the imposition of direct rule was the result of imposition by Paris of social and political changes:

[The] West's counterrevolution grew directly from the efforts of revolutionary officials to install a particular kind of direct rule in the region: a rule that practically eliminated nobles and priests from their positions as partly autonomous intermediaries, that brought the state's demands for taxes, manpower, and deference to the level of individual communities, neighborhoods, and households that gave the region's bourgeois political power they had never before wielded. In seeking to extend the state's rule to every locality, and to dislodge all enemies of that rule, French revolutionaries started a process that did not cease for twenty-five years.

But other historians posit the insurrection as a revolt against conscription that cascaded to include other complaints.

For a period of several months, control of the Vendée slipped from the hands of Parisian revolutionaries. They ascribed the revolt to the resurgence of royalist ideas: when faced with insurrection of the people against the Revolution of the People, they were unable to see it as anything but an aristocratic plot. Mona Ozouf and François Furet maintain it was not. The entire territory, none of it unified under a single idea from the ancien régime, had never been a region morally at odds with the rest of the nation. It was not the fall of the old regime that aroused the population against the Revolution, but rather the construction of the new regime into locally unacceptable principles and forms: the new map of districts and departments, the administrative dictatorship, and above all the non-juring priests. Even the regicide did not trigger insurrection. What did was the forced conscription. Although the Vendeans, to use the term loosely, wrote God and King large on their flags, they invested those symbols of their tradition with something other than regret for the lost regime.

== Genocide controversy ==
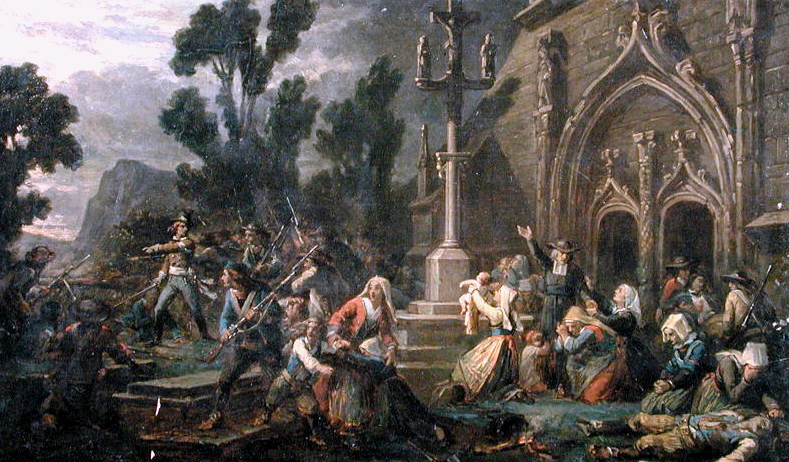
Soldiers, women, and children embroiled in a fight near a church

The popular historiography of the War in the Vendée is deeply rooted in the pervasive political polarisation within post-1789 French culture and historiography. As a result, scholarship on the uprising is generally lacking in objectivity, coming down strongly in defense of either the French First Republic or of the Vendéen rebels and the local Catholic Church. This conflict originated in the 19th century between two groups of historians. The Bleus, so-named for their defense of the French Revolutionary Army and who based their interpretations solely on documents from Republican sources. The Blancs, on the other hand, are so named in a denigrating reference to their continued membership in the Catholic Church in France, also based their findings on Republican archival documents, but also used eyewitness accounts, memoirs by survivors, and "local oral histories". Les Bleus generally allege that the War in Vendée was not a popular uprising, but was the result of reactionary noble and priestly lies and manipulation of the local peasantry against their liberators. One of the leaders of this school of history, Charles-Louis Chassin, published eleven volumes of letters, archives, and other materials in an effort to argue for this interpretation. Meanwhile, Les Blancs were at least sometimes Roman Catholic priests, local historians, or survivors of the pre-1789 local French nobility. They allege, on the other hand, that the Vendean peasant rebels were acting out of "genuine love" and loyalty towards individual local families of less wealthy and non-absentee landlords and, far more importantly, a desire to protect the Catholic Church from both religious persecution, the Reign of Terror, and coerced Caesaropapism at the hands of the First French Republic.

The Counter-Enlightenment interpretation by Les Blancs was widely popularized among the social conservatives throughout the Anglosphere during the Neoliberal era, with French historian Reynald Secher's 1986 A French Genocide: The Vendée. Secher argued that the total war against the local population and the scorched earth tactics unleashed by both the Republican government and the French Revolutionary Army during the War in the Vendée were the first modern genocide. Secher's claims caused a minor uproar in France among scholars of French history, as many mainstream authorities on the period—both French and foreign—published articles denouncing Secher's allegations. Claude Langlois (of the Institute of History of the French Revolution) derides Secher's claims as "quasi-mythological". Timothy Tackett of the University of California contends: "In reality ... the Vendée was a tragic civil war with endless horrors committed by both sides—initiated, in fact, by the rebels themselves. The Vendeans were no more blameless than were the republicans. The use of the word genocide is wholly inaccurate and inappropriate." Hugh Gough (Professor of history at University College Dublin) called Secher's book an attempt at historical revisionism unlikely to have any lasting impact. While some such as Peter McPhee roundly criticized Secher, including the assertion of commonality between the functions of the Republican government and the totalitarianism of Stalinism, historian Pierre Chaunu expressed support for Secher's views, describing the events as the first "ideological genocide".

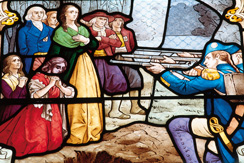
Shootings and massacres by the Colonnes infernales under Turreau

Critics of Secher's thesis have also accused his methodology of being flawed. McPhee asserted that these errors are as follows: (1) The war was not fought against Vendeans generally but Royalist Vendeans; the government relied on the support of Republican Vendeans. (2) The Convention ended the campaign after the Royalist Army was clearly defeated—if the aim was genocide, then they would have continued and easily exterminated the population. (3) He fails to inform the reader of atrocities committed by Royalist forces against Republican civilians and POWs in the Vendée. (4) He repeats folkloric myths as facts (5) He does not refer to the wide range of estimates of deaths suffered by both sides, and that casualties were not "one-sided"; and more.

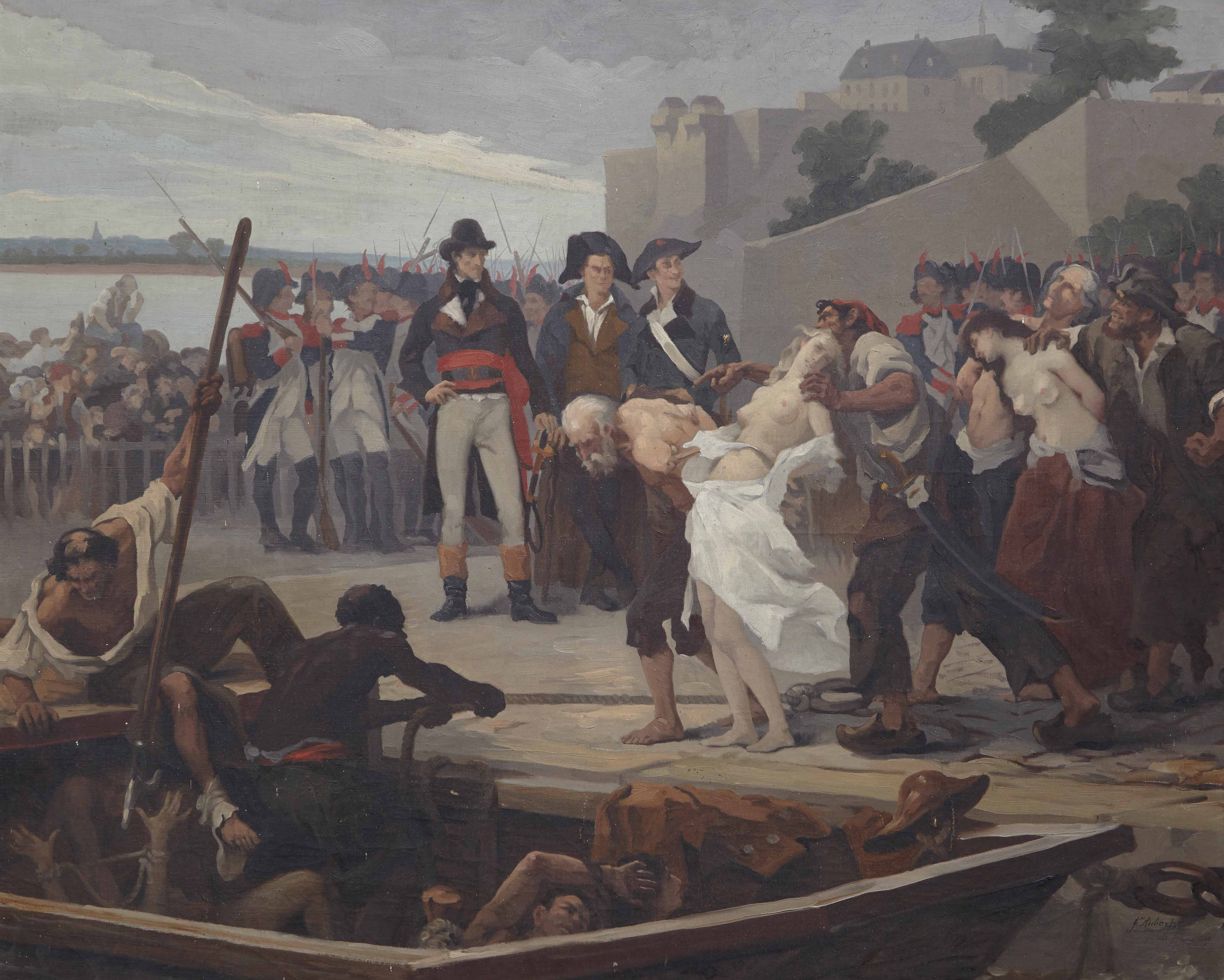
Drownings at Nantes.

Peter McPhee says that the pacification of the Vendée does not fit either the United Nations' CPPCG definition of genocide because the events happened during a civil war. He states that the war in the Vendée was not a one-sided mass killing and the Committee of Public Safety did not intend to exterminate the whole population of the Vendée; as parts of the population at least were allies of the revolutionary government.

Concerning the controversy, Michel Vovelle, a specialist on the French Revolution who was closely associated with the Communist Party, remarked: "A whole literature is forming on 'Franco-French genocide', starting from risky estimates of the number of fatalities in the Vendean wars ... Despite not being specialists in the subject, historians such as Pierre Chaunu have put all the weight of their great moral authority behind the development of an anathematizing discourse, and have dismissed any effort to look at the subject reasonably."

Shortly before his return to the Russian Federation after decades of exile in 1993, former Soviet dissident and winner of the 1970 Nobel Prize in Literature Alexander Solzhenitsyn delivered a speech in Les Lucs-sur-Boulogne to commemorate the 200th anniversary of the Vendée Uprising. Coming down strongly in favor of calling the Republican response genocidal, Solzhenitsyn compared Vladimir Lenin's Bolsheviks following the October Revolution with the leadership of the Jacobin Club during the French Revolution. Solzhenitsyn also compared the Vendean rebels with the Russian, Ukrainian, and Cossack peasants who similarly rebelled against the Bolsheviks, saying that both were destroyed mercilessly by "revolutionary despotism". He commented sadly that, while the French Reign of Terror ended with the Thermidorian reaction, the toppling of the Jacobin single party state by the French Revolutionary Army, and the execution of Maximilien Robespierre, its Soviet equivalent continued to accelerate until the Khrushchev thaw of the 1950s.

Debate over the characterization of the Vendée uprising was renewed in 2007, when nine deputies introduced a measure to the National Assembly to officially recognize the Republican actions as genocidal. The measure was strongly denounced by a group of French historians as an attempt to use history to justify political extremism.

At the start of 2017 Jacques Villemain published Vendée, 1793–1794 : Crime de guerre ? Crime contre l'humanité ? Génocide ? Une étude juridique (English: Vendée, 1793–1794: War crime? Crime against humanity? Genocide? A juridical study), which is an analysis by him of the Vendée war from the perspective of the international courts of justice in The Hague (such as the International Criminal Tribunal for the Former Yugoslavia and the International Criminal Tribunal for Rwanda). Jacques Villemain is a French diplomat, and is currently the vice representative of France at OECD and is representing France at the International Court of Justice. His study, based on current international criminal law and informed by modern findings in international courts on genocide cases such as the Rwanda Genocide and the Srebrenica massacre, concluded that the government of the French First Republic was guilty of war crimes beginning in March 1793, crimes against humanity between April and July 1793, and genocide from 1 August 1793 to the middle of 1794.

== Challenging the methodology ==
In the heart of the modern controversy lies Secher's evidence, which Charles Tilly analyzed in 1990. Initially, Tilly maintains, Secher completed a thoughtful dissertation-style thesis about the revolutionary experience in his own village, La Chapelle-Basse-Mer, which lies near Nantes. In the published version of his thesis, he incorporated some of Tilly's own arguments: that conflicts within communities generalized into a region-wide confrontation of anti-revolutionary majority based in the countryside with a pro-revolutionary minority that had particular strength in the cities. The split formed with the application of the Civil Constitution of the Clergy and the oath to support it, in 1790–1792. From then, the local conflicts grew more sharply defined, over the choice between juring and non-juring priests. The conscription of March 1793, with the questionable exemption for Republican officials and National Guard members, broadened the anti-revolutionary coalition and brought the young men into action.

With Le génocide français, Reynald Secher's thesis for the Doctorat d'État began with a generalization of the standard arguments to the whole region. Although La Chapelle-Basse-Mer served him repeatedly as a reference point, Secher illustrated his arguments with wide citations from national and regional archives to establish a broader frame of reference. Furthermore, he drew on graphic, nineteenth-century accounts widely known to the historians of the Vendee: Carrier drownings and the "infernal columns of Turreau". Most importantly, however, Secher broke with conventional assessments by asserting on the basis of minimal evidence, Tilly claims, that the pre-revolutionary Vendée was more prosperous than the rest of France (to better emphasize the devastation of the war and the repression). He used dubious statistical methods to establish population losses and fatalities, statistical processes that inflated the number of people in the region, the number and value of houses, and the financial losses of the region. Secher's statistical procedure relied on three unjustifiable assumptions. First, Secher assumes a constant birth rate of about 37 per thousand of population, when actually, Tilly maintains, the population was declining. Second, Secher assumes no net migration; Tilly maintains that thousands fled the region, or at least shifted where they lived within the region. Finally, Secher understated the population present at the end of the conflict by ending it 1802, not 1794.

Despite the criticism, a number of scholars continue the assertion of genocide. In addition to Secher and Chaunu, Kurt Jonassohn and Frank Chalk also consider it a case of genocide. Further support comes from Adam Jones, who wrote in Genocide: A Comprehensive Introduction a summary of the Vendée uprising, supporting the view that it was a genocide: "the Vendée Uprising stands as a notable example of a mass killing campaign that has only recently been conceptualized as 'genocide'" and that while this designation "is not universally shared ... it seems apt in the light of the large scale murder of a designated group (the Vendéan civilian population)." Pierre Chaunu describes it as the first "ideological genocide." Mark Levene, a historian who specializes in the study of genocide, considers the Vendée "an archetype of modern genocide". Other scholars who consider the massacres to be genocide include R. J. Rummel, Jean Tulard, and Anthony James Joes.

In 2020, David Bell published a paper in Journal of Genocide Research arguing against the genocide theory, writing:

It goes without saying that refusing the label of genocide to the mass killings in the Vendée in no way excuses what happened. What happened was horrific and qualifies as a terrible war crime. More than that, indeed, the massacres of early 1794 marked a frightening new stage in the history of state violence against civilian populations. [...] Once the political grouping defined as "Vendéen" had been targeted, all its members had to perish. This evolution in state violence derived both from what I have elsewhere called conditions of "total war", and from French revolutionary ideology. For these reasons, Mark Levene gives the Vendée a prominent place in his scholarly, carefully argued history of the "coming of genocide" in the age of the nation-state, alongside the actions of European states in their overseas empire.

I would argue, however, that if we define all deliberate large-scale killings of defenseless civilians in wartime as genocide – even taking note of the distinctions made by Levene – then genocide becomes so broadly defined as to lose its meaning.

== Cultural depictions ==
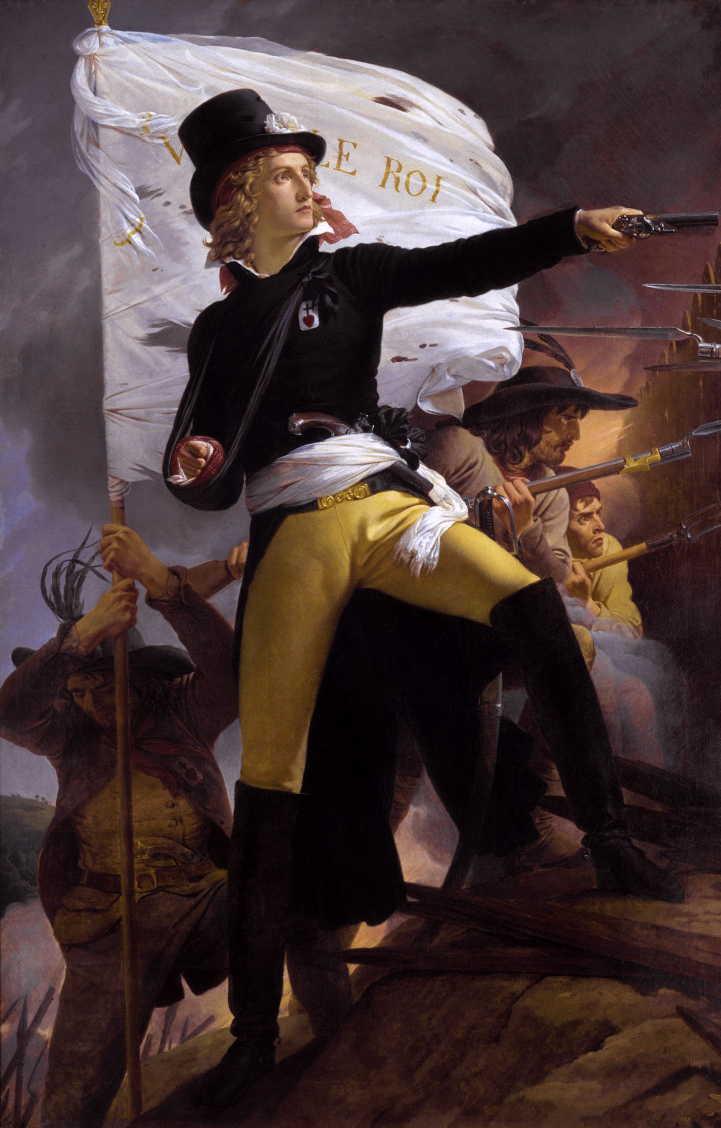
Portrait of Henri de la Rochejaquelein Pierre-Narcisse Guérin, 1816

The events of the Vendée have been the subject of books, films, and music.

=== Film and television ===
Filmed on location in France, The Hidden Rebellion, a docu-drama produced and directed by Daniel Rabourdin, presents the rebellion as an example of the courage and love for God and country that the royalists possessed. Winner of the 2017 Remi Film Award, it has aired on EWTN and is available for purchase on DVD. The uprising in the Vendée was also the subject of an independent feature film from Navis Pictures. The War of the Vendée (2012), written and directed by Jim Morlino, won awards for "Best Film For Young Audiences" (Mirabile Dictu International Catholic Film Festival, at the Vatican) and "Best Director" (John Paul II International Film Festival, Miami, FL).

The Vendée Revolt was the setting for one of the BBC's The Scarlet Pimpernel (TV series) series entitled "Valentine Gautier" (2002). The Vendée Revolt was also the setting for "The Frogs and the Lobsters", an episode of the television program Hornblower. It is set during the French Revolutionary Wars and very loosely based on the chapter of the same name in C. S. Forester's novel, Mr. Midshipman Hornblower and on the actual ill-fated Quiberon expedition of 1795. Vaincre ou mourir was a related 2022 film released by Studio Canal in co-operation with the Puy du Fou theme park company.

=== Music ===
- Album Chante la Vendée Militaire (La Chouannerie), by Catherine Garret, 1977.
- Album Vendée 1792–1796, by the Chœur Montjoie Saint-Denis, 2005 (reedition in 2016).
- EP Guerres de Vendée: Chouans, by Jean-Pax Méfret, 2006.
- The French black/folk metal band Paydretz works and plays exclusively about the Wars in the Vendée and the Chouannerie.
- La Vandeana, an Italian song about the Vendée.

== See also ==
- Vendean leaders:
  - Charles Melchior Artus de Bonchamps
  - Jacques Cathelineau
  - François Athanase de Charette
  - Maurice d'Elbée
  - Louis Marie de Salgues de Lescure
  - Henri du Vergier de la Rochejaquelein
  - Charles Aimé de Royrand
  - Jean-Nicolas Stofflet
  - Marie-Adélaïde de La Touche-Limouzinière
- Republican leaders:
  - Louis-Alexandre Berthier
  - Jean-Baptiste Carrier
  - Lazare Hoche
  - Jean-Baptiste Kléber
  - Antoine Joseph Santerre
  - François Joseph Westermann
- Other links:
  - Chouannerie (another Royalist uprising)
  - Catholic and Royal Army
  - Armée des Émigrés
  - Drownings at Nantes (mass executions by drowning)
  - Dechristianisation of France during the French Revolution
  - Reign of Terror
  - Cholet
  - Clisson
  - Fontenay-le-Comte
  - La Roche-sur-Yon (capital of Vendée)
  - Ninety-Three (novel by Victor Hugo)
  - Marie Lourdais
  - Battle of Chantonnay (March 1793)

Preceded by War of the First Coalition	French Revolution: Revolutionary campaigns War in the Vendée	Succeeded by Battle of Neerwinden (1793)
