= Montréverd =

- Commune
- Location of Montréverd
- Location within France Location within Pays de la Loire
- Coordinates: 46°56′02″N 1°24′43″W
- Country: France
- Region: Pays de la Loire
- Department: Vendée
- Arrondissement: La Roche-sur-Yon
- Canton: Aizenay
- Intercommunality: CA Terres de Montaigu

Government
  - Mayor (2020–2026): Damien Grasset
- Area^{1}: 48.47 km^{2} (18.71 sq mi)
- Population (2023): 3,857
  - Density: 79.57/km^{2} (206.1/sq mi)
- Time zone: UTC+01:00 (CET)
  - Summer (DST): UTC+02:00 (CEST)
- INSEE/Postal code: 85197 /85260
- ^{1} French Land Register data, which excludes lakes, ponds, glaciers > 1 km^{2} (0.386 sq mi or 247 acres) and river estuaries.

Montréverd (French pronunciation: [mɔ̃tʁevɛʁ]) is a commune in the department of Vendée, western France. The municipality was established on 1 January 2016 by merger of the former communes of Saint-André-Treize-Voies, Mormaison and Saint-Sulpice-le-Verdon.

== Population ==
Population data refer to the area corresponding with the commune as of January 2025.

Historical population
Year	Pop.	±% p.a.
1968	2,487	—
1975	2,193	−1.78%
1982	2,210	+0.11%
1990	2,307	+0.54%
1999	2,414	+0.51%
2007	2,992	+2.72%
2012	3,409	+2.64%
2017	3,700	+1.65%
2023	3,857	+0.70%
Source: INSEE

== See also ==
- Communes of the Vendée department
