= Canton of Aizenay =

Coordinates: 46.74°N 1.61°W

The canton of Aizenay is an administrative division of the Vendée department, western France. It was created at the French canton reorganisation which came into effect in March 2015. Its seat is in Aizenay.

It consists of the following communes:

1. Aizenay
2. Beaufou
3. Bellevigny
4. La Genétouze
5. L'Herbergement
6. Les Lucs-sur-Boulogne
7. Montréverd
8. Le Poiré-sur-Vie
9. Rocheservière
10. Saint-Denis-la-Chevasse
11. Saint-Philbert-de-Bouaine
