= Cugand =

Commune in Vendée, France

- Part of Cugand-la-Bernardière
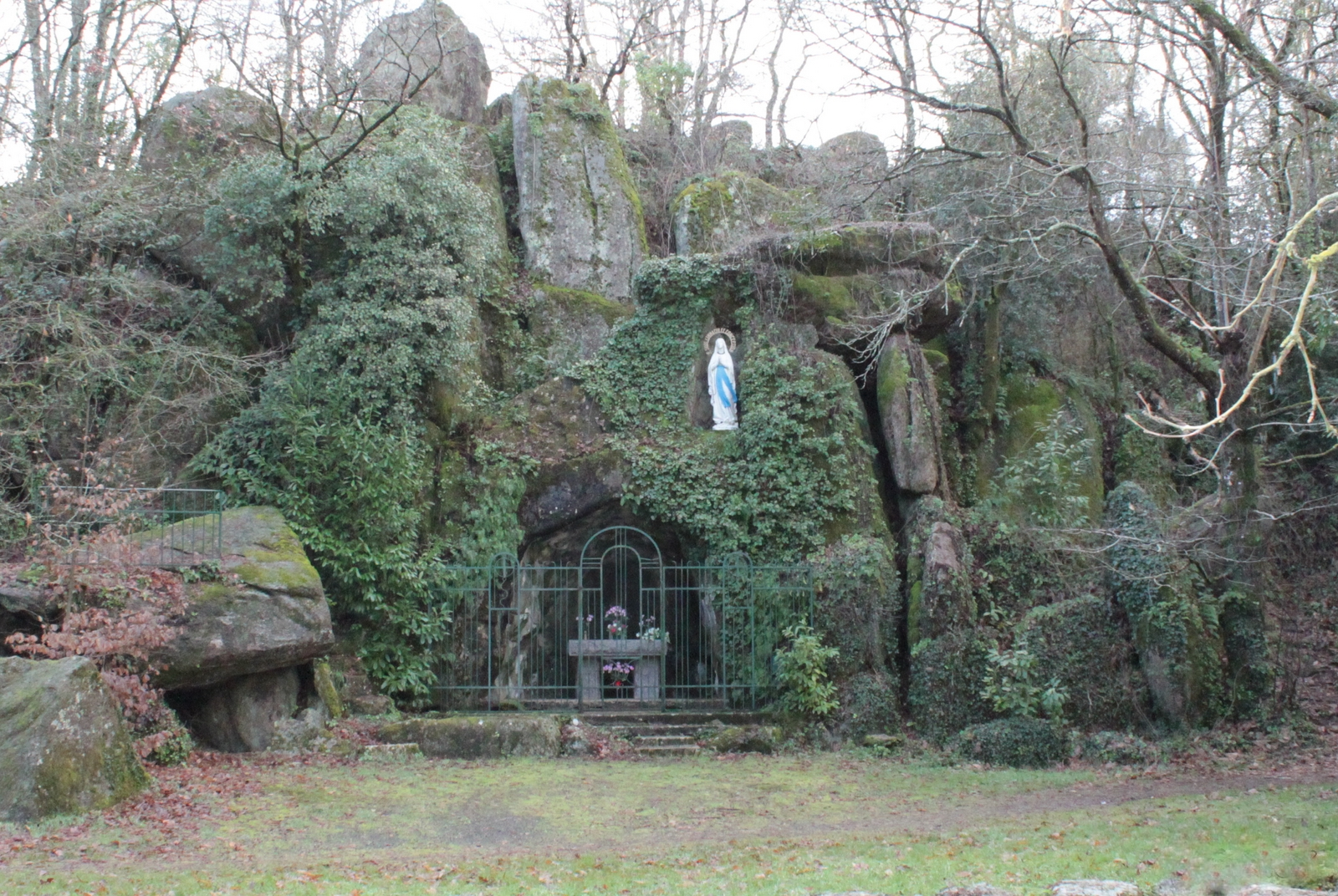
- A replica of the Lourdes Grotto

- Coat of arms
- Location of Cugand
- Location within France Location within Pays de la Loire
- Coordinates: 47°03′47″N 1°15′12″W
- Country: France
- Region: Pays de la Loire
- Department: Vendée
- Arrondissement: La Roche-sur-Yon
- Canton: Mortagne-sur-Sèvre
- Commune: Cugand-la-Bernardière
- Area^{1}: 13.47 km^{2} (5.20 sq mi)
- Highest elevation: 71 m (233 ft)
- Lowest elevation: 13 m (43 ft)
- Population (2022): 3,746
  - Density: 278.1/km^{2} (720.3/sq mi)
- Time zone: UTC+01:00 (CET)
  - Summer (DST): UTC+02:00 (CEST)
- Postal code: 85610
- ^{1} French Land Register data, which excludes lakes, ponds, glaciers > 1 km^{2} (0.386 sq mi or 247 acres) and river estuaries.

Cugand (French pronunciation: [kyɡɑ̃]) is a former commune in the Vendée department in the Pays de la Loire region in western France.

Before the creation of the departments with the French Republic, under the French Kingdom, the parish of Cugand was part of "Marches Bretagne-Poitou" (joint possession) and of Brittany on the religious level (Roman Catholic Diocese of Nantes).

It is part of the urban unit of Clisson.

Cugand merged with the adjacent commune of La Bernardière on 1 January 2025 to form the commune of Cugand-la-Bernardière, although it remains a delegated commune with its own mayor.

== Geography ==
Cugand is located along the Sèvre Nantaise, 28 km south-east of Nantes and 29 km south-west of Cholet.

Its neighboring communes were:

- In Vendée
  - La Bernardière
  - La Bruffière
- In Loire-Atlantique :
  - Clisson
  - Gétigné
  - Saint-Hilaire-de-Clisson
  - Boussay

== Climate ==
In 2020, Météo-France has published a typology of the climates of Metropolitan France in which Cugand is exposed to an Oceanic climate and located in the "Bretagne Orientale et Méridionale, Pays Nantais, Vendée" climatic region where the amount of rainfall is low in the summer.

== Population ==
Historical population
Year	Pop.	±% p.a.
1968	2,199	—
1975	2,425	+1.41%
1982	2,525	+0.58%
1990	2,627	+0.50%
1999	2,776	+0.61%
2010	3,269	+1.50%
2015	3,448	+1.07%
2021	3,685	+1.11%
Source: INSEE

== Local life ==
=== Sport ===
- Sportive Union Bernardière Cugand : football division
- Basketball Association Cugand Bernardière : basketball division
- St Michel Handball : handball division
- "Les raquettes Cugandaises" : tennis division
- Athlétisme Mingot Association : athletics division
- TTAL Cugand : table tennis division

=== Health ===
- Health Center Les Caducées

=== Schools ===
- Private elementary school St Michel / Jeanne d'Arc
- Public elementary school Jean Moulin

=== Culture ===
- Cugand library

=== Events ===
- "Festival de Cugand", world dance and music, folk bands of the all world, during four days in August (20,000 spectators in 2005 for the 7th festival edition); last edition held in 2018
