= Cugand-la-Bernardière =

- Commune
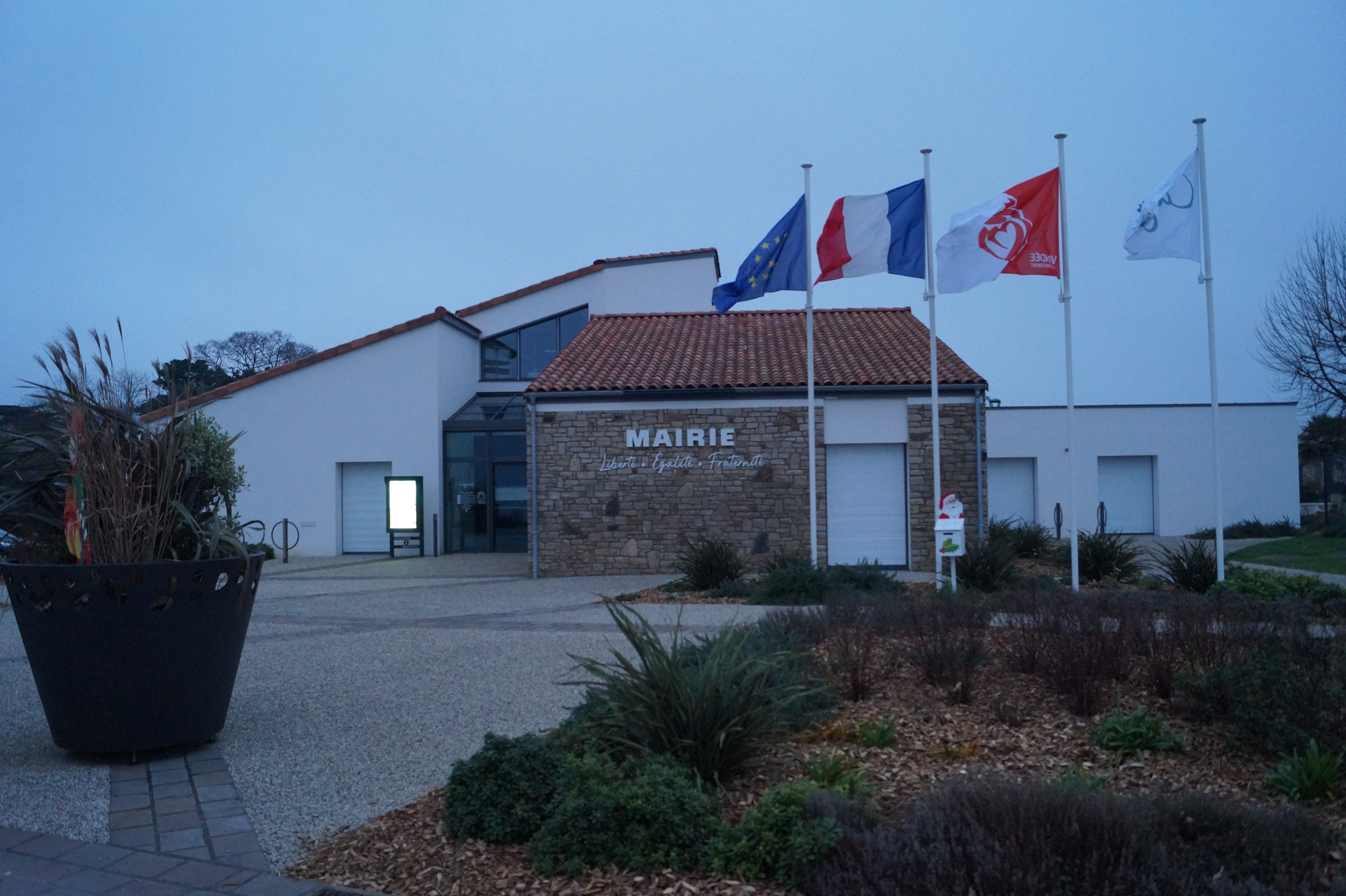
- Cugand's town hall in 2025
- Location of Cugand-la-Bernardière
- Location within France Location within Pays de la Loire
- Coordinates: 47°03′N 1°15′W
- Country: France
- Region: Pays de la Loire
- Department: Vendée
- Arrondissement: La Roche-sur-Yon
- Canton: Mortagne-sur-Sèvre
- Intercommunality: CA Terres de Montaigu

Government
  - Mayor (2025–2026): Claude Durand
- Area^{1}: 28.56 km^{2} (11.03 sq mi)
- Highest elevation: 76 m (249 ft)
- Lowest elevation: 13 m (43 ft)
- Population (2023): 5,711
  - Density: 200.0/km^{2} (517.9/sq mi)
- Time zone: UTC+01:00 (CET)
  - Summer (DST): UTC+02:00 (CEST)
- INSEE/Postal code: 85076 /85610
- Website: Official website
- ^{1} French Land Register data, which excludes lakes, ponds, glaciers > 1 km^{2} (0.386 sq mi or 247 acres) and river estuaries.

Cugand-la-Bernardière (French pronunciation: [kyɡɑ̃ la bɛʁnaʁdjɛʁ]) is a commune in the Vendée department in the Pays de la Loire region in western France. It was formed on 1 January 2025 by the merger of Cugand and La Bernardière.

== Geography and climate ==
Cugand-la-Bernardière is located on the south bank of the Sèvre Nantaise, 28 km southeast of Nantes. It borders the following communes:

- In Vendée:
  - La Bruffière
  - Saint-Hilaire-de-Loulay
  - Treize-Septiers
- In Loire-Atlantique:
  - Boussay
  - Clisson
  - Gétigné
  - Saint-Hilaire-de-Clisson

Like the rest of the Vendée, Cugand-la-Bernardière has an oceanic climate.

== History ==
The Brittany–Poitou marches in the 15th century.

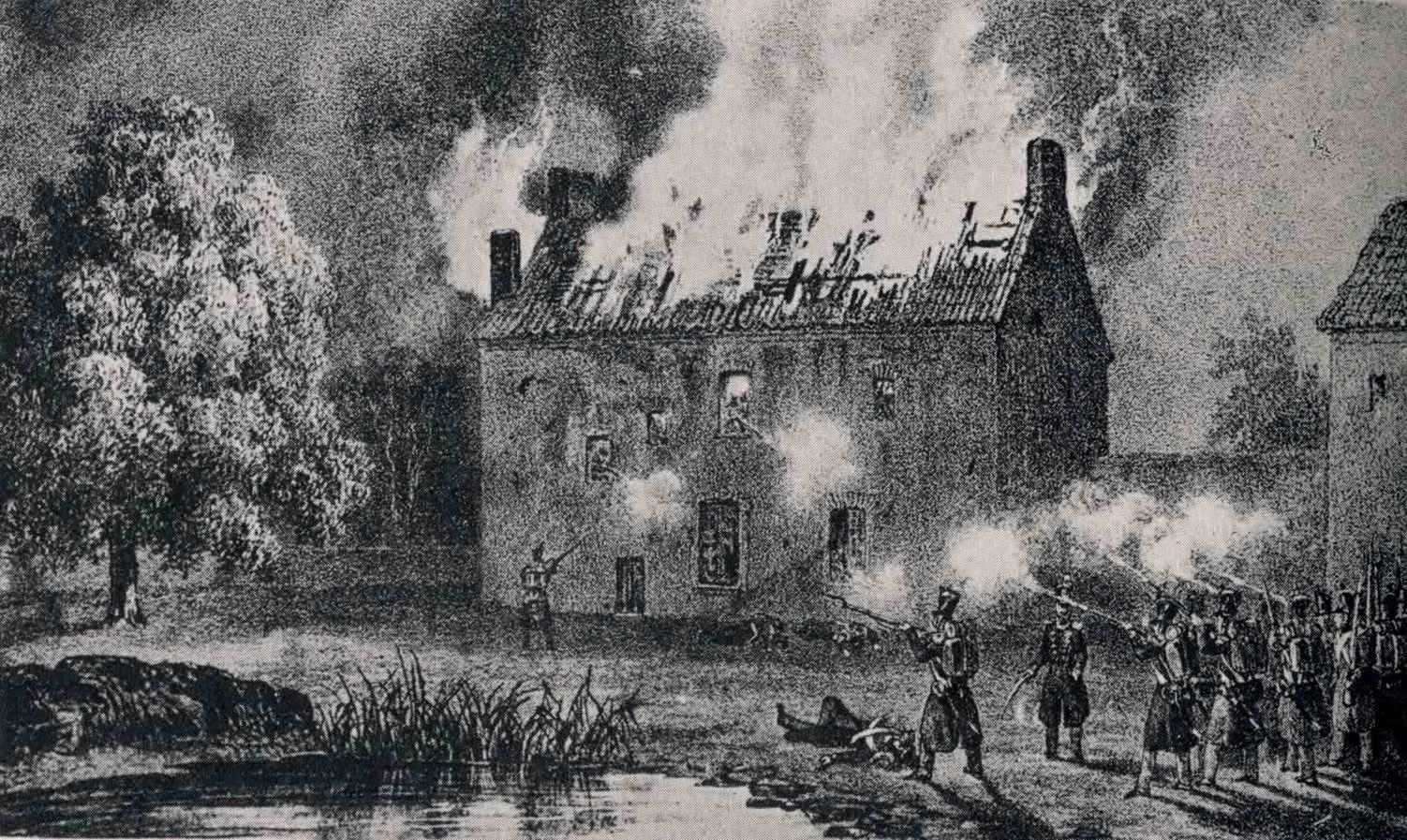
The battle of la Penissière in La Bernardière on 6 June 1832.

The name Cugand is attested in 1287 as Cugant. La Bernardière was once known as La Bernardière-en-Forêts, but the forests have long since disappeared.

The Western Roman emperor Honorius built fortifications in Cugand to stop Breton incursions, but only traces of the Roman presence remain. Under the Kingdom of France, Cugand and La Bernardière belonged to the Brittany–Poitou marches. In 1789, Cugand had about 1800 inhabitants, but the town lost about 200 people in the War in the Vendée during the French Revolution.

In the 19th century, Cugand became the most industrialized town in the Vendée. The paper and weaving businesses prospered thanks to a favourable tax regime and the ability to power tanning, fulling and paper mills using the Sèvre Nantaise. The last textile mill in Cugand operated until 1985.

On 6 June 1832, one of the last events in the Duchess of Berry's abortive uprising to put her son Henri on the French throne occurred in La Bernardière, when a group of Legitimists was besieged at the chateau of la Penissière by Orléanist troops.

In order to more efficiently pool their resources, the communes of Cugand and La Bernardière agreed to merge to form the new commune of Cugand-la-Bernardière, effective 1 January 2025. On 6 January, the councillors of the former communes elected Claude Durand, mayor of La Bernardière since 1989, as the mayor of the new commune. The former communes have been replaced by delegated communes, each having a delegated mayor, and the town halls in both communes will remain functional.

== Population ==
Population data refer to the area corresponding with the commune as of January 2025.

Historical population
Year	Pop.	±% p.a.
1968	3,040	—
1975	3,214	+0.80%
1982	3,585	+1.57%
1990	3,736	+0.52%
1999	3,948	+0.62%
2007	4,703	+2.21%
2012	5,075	+1.53%
2017	5,313	+0.92%
2023	5,711	+1.21%
Source: INSEE

== Economy ==
There are several business and industrial parks in Cugand, where the largest employer is MéO, a manufacturer of windows and doors. Part of the Liebot Group and formerly known as MC France, it has operated a factory in Cugand since 2014. La Bernardière's economy is more focused on agriculture and small businesses.
