= Saint-Florent-des-Bois =

- Part of Rives-de-l'Yon
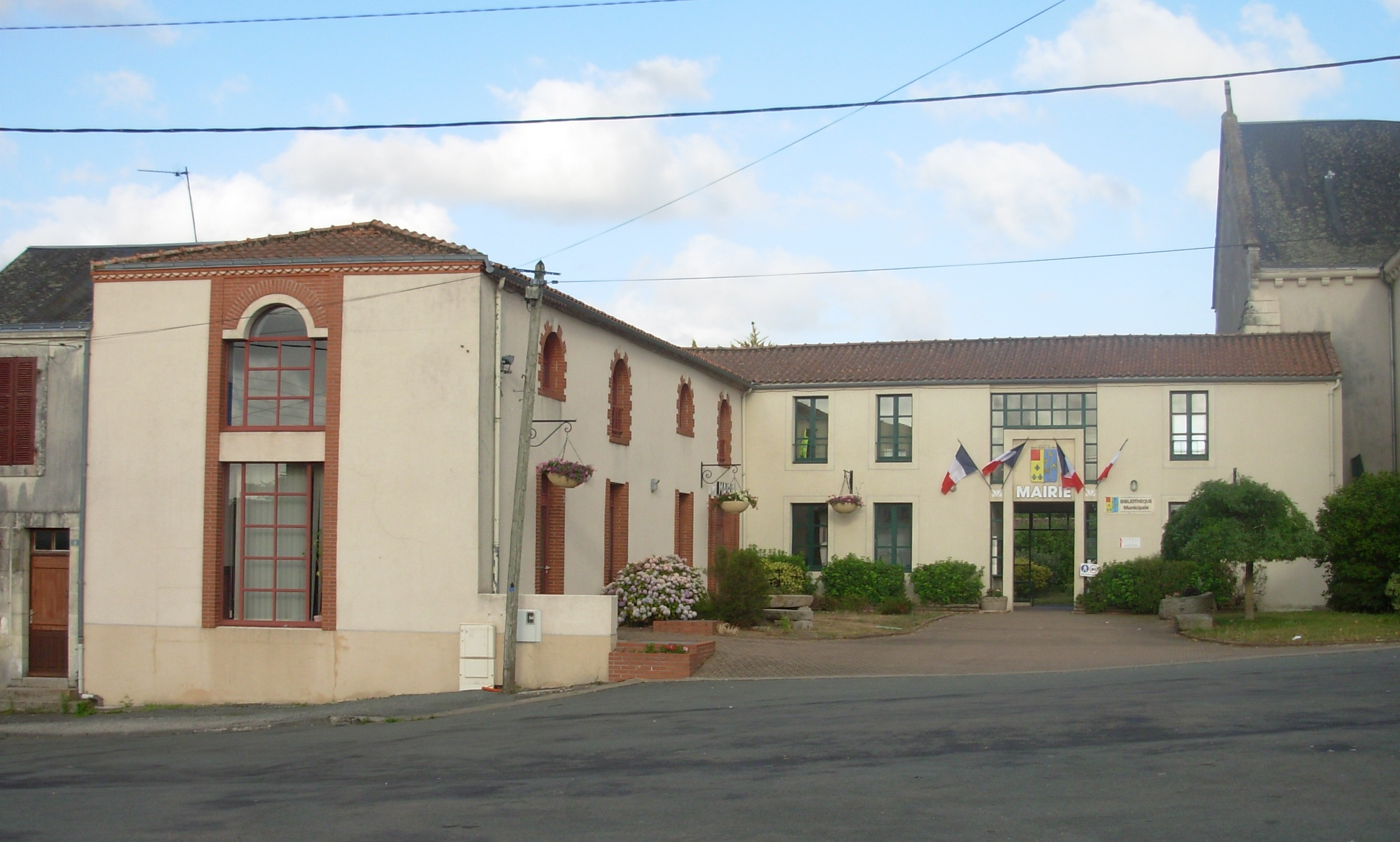
- The town hall in Saint-Florent-des-Bois

- Coat of arms
- Location of Saint-Florent-des-Bois
- Location within France Location within Pays de la Loire
- Coordinates: 46°35′40″N 1°18′53″W
- Country: France
- Region: Pays de la Loire
- Department: Vendée
- Arrondissement: La Roche-sur-Yon
- Canton: Mareuil-sur-Lay-Dissais
- Commune: Rives-de-l'Yon
- Area^{1}: 36.76 km^{2} (14.19 sq mi)
- Elevation: 42 m (138 ft)
- Highest elevation: 83 m (272 ft)
- Lowest elevation: 18 m (59 ft)
- Population (2022): 2,906
  - Density: 79.05/km^{2} (204.7/sq mi)
- Time zone: UTC+01:00 (CET)
  - Summer (DST): UTC+02:00 (CEST)
- Postal code: 85310
- ^{1} French Land Register data, which excludes lakes, ponds, glaciers > 1 km^{2} (0.386 sq mi or 247 acres) and river estuaries.

Saint-Florent-des-Bois (French pronunciation: [sɛ̃ flɔʁɑ̃ de bwa]) is a former commune in the Vendée department in the Pays de la Loire region in western France. On 1 January 2016, it was merged into the new commune of Rives-de-l'Yon.

It is located on the periphery of La Roche-sur-Yon.

== Twin towns ==
Saint-Florent-des-Bois is twinned with the village of Silkstone in South Yorkshire, England

== Geography ==
The river Yon forms part of the commune's western border.

== See also ==
- Communes of the Vendée department
