= Ormeaux =

Ormeaux may refer to:

== People ==
- Adam Dollard des Ormeaux, colonist and soldier of New France

== Places ==
Canada

- Dollard-Des Ormeaux–Roxboro, former borough in the West Island area of Montreal, Quebec
- Dollard-des-Ormeaux, town on the Island of Montreal, Quebec

France

- Chaillé-sous-les-Ormeaux, village and commune of the Vendée département
- Lumigny-Nesles-Ormeaux, commune in the Seine-et-Marne département
- Saint-Aubin-des-Ormeaux, village and commune of the Vendée département
- Savignac-les-Ormeaux, commune in the Ariège department
