= La Bernardière =

Commune in Vendée, France

- Part of Cugand-la-Bernardière
- Coat of arms
- Location of La Bernardière
- Location within France Location within Pays de la Loire
- Coordinates: 47°03′02″N 1°15′53″W
- Country: France
- Region: Pays de la Loire
- Department: Vendée
- Arrondissement: La Roche-sur-Yon
- Canton: Mortagne-sur-Sèvre
- Commune: Cugand-la-Bernardière
- Area^{1}: 14.30 km^{2} (5.52 sq mi)
- Highest elevation: 76 m (249 ft)
- Lowest elevation: 33 m (108 ft)
- Population (2022): 1,913
  - Density: 133.8/km^{2} (346.5/sq mi)
- Time zone: UTC+01:00 (CET)
  - Summer (DST): UTC+02:00 (CEST)
- Postal code: 85610
- ^{1} French Land Register data, which excludes lakes, ponds, glaciers > 1 km^{2} (0.386 sq mi or 247 acres) and river estuaries.

La Bernardière (French pronunciation: [la bɛʁnaʁdjɛʁ]) is a former commune in the Vendée department in the Pays de la Loire region in western France. It merged with the adjacent commune of Cugand on 1 January 2025 to form the commune of Cugand-la-Bernardière, but remains a delegated commune.
