= L'Herbergement =

- Commune
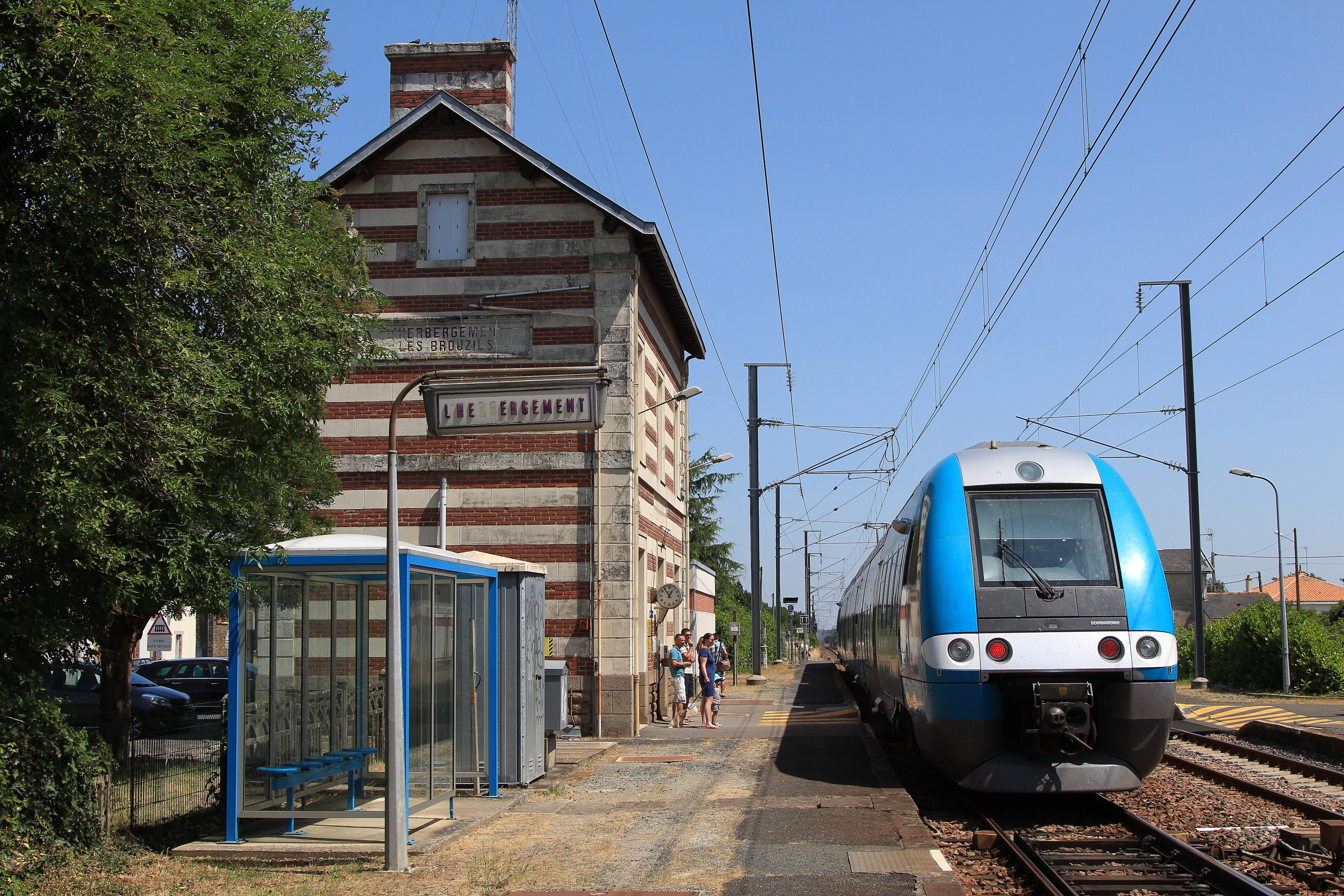
- The L'Herbergement - Les Brouzils railway station

- Coat of arms
- Location of L'Herbergement
- Location within France Location within Pays de la Loire
- Coordinates: 46°54′36″N 1°22′33″W
- Country: France
- Region: Pays de la Loire
- Department: Vendée
- Arrondissement: La Roche-sur-Yon
- Canton: Aizenay
- Intercommunality: CA Terres de Montaigu

Government
  - Mayor (2020–2026): Anne Boisteau-Payen
- Area^{1}: 16.75 km^{2} (6.47 sq mi)
- Highest elevation: 72 m (236 ft)
- Lowest elevation: 39 m (128 ft)
- Population (2023): 3,482
  - Density: 207.9/km^{2} (538.4/sq mi)
- Time zone: UTC+01:00 (CET)
  - Summer (DST): UTC+02:00 (CEST)
- INSEE/Postal code: 85108 /85260
- ^{1} French Land Register data, which excludes lakes, ponds, glaciers > 1 km^{2} (0.386 sq mi or 247 acres) and river estuaries.

L'Herbergement (French pronunciation: [lɛʁbɛʁʒəmɑ̃]) is a commune in the Vendée department in the Pays de la Loire region in western France.

== Population ==
Historical population
Year	Pop.	±% p.a.
1968	1,414	—
1975	1,531	+1.14%
1982	1,654	+1.11%
1990	1,706	+0.39%
1999	1,896	+1.18%
2007	2,551	+3.78%
2012	2,903	+2.62%
2017	3,175	+1.81%
2023	3,482	+1.55%
Source: INSEE

== See also ==
- Communes of the Vendée department
