= Mesnard-la-Barotière =

- Commune
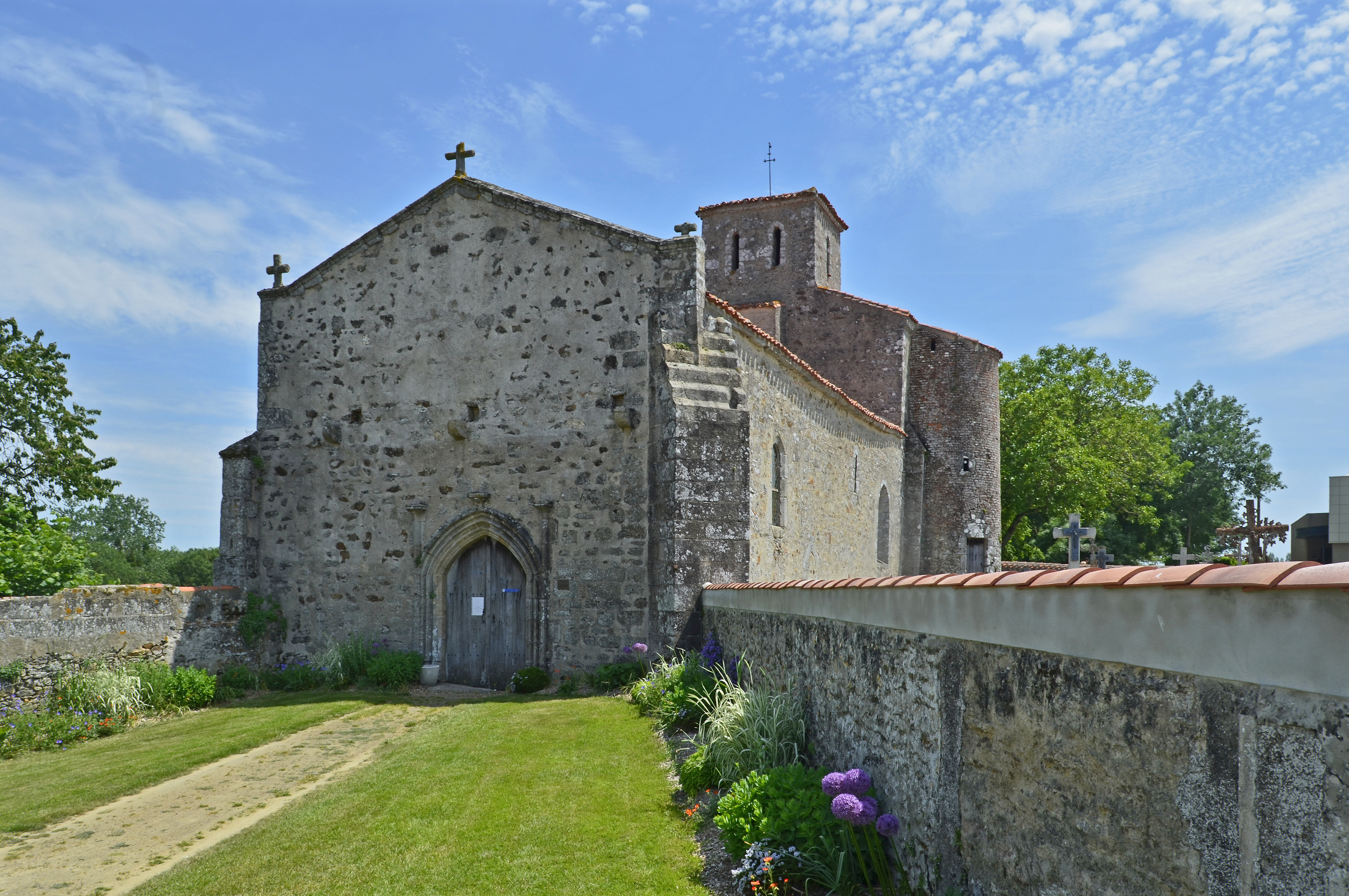
- The Church of Saint-Christophe, in Mesnard-la-Barotière

- Coat of arms
- Location of Mesnard-la-Barotière
- Location within France Location within Pays de la Loire
- Coordinates: 46°51′35″N 1°05′55″W
- Country: France
- Region: Pays de la Loire
- Department: Vendée
- Arrondissement: La Roche-sur-Yon
- Canton: Montaigu-Vendée
- Intercommunality: Pays des Herbiers

Government
  - Mayor (2020–2026): Landry Rondeau
- Area^{1}: 11.83 km^{2} (4.57 sq mi)
- Highest elevation: 109 m (358 ft)
- Lowest elevation: 73 m (240 ft)
- Population (2023): 1,558
  - Density: 131.7/km^{2} (341.1/sq mi)
- Time zone: UTC+01:00 (CET)
  - Summer (DST): UTC+02:00 (CEST)
- INSEE/Postal code: 85144 /85500
- ^{1} French Land Register data, which excludes lakes, ponds, glaciers > 1 km^{2} (0.386 sq mi or 247 acres) and river estuaries.

Mesnard-la-Barotière (French pronunciation: [mɛnaʁ la baʁɔtjɛʁ]) is a commune in the Vendée department in the Pays de la Loire region in western France.

== See also ==
- Communes of the Vendée department
