= Vendrennes =

- Commune
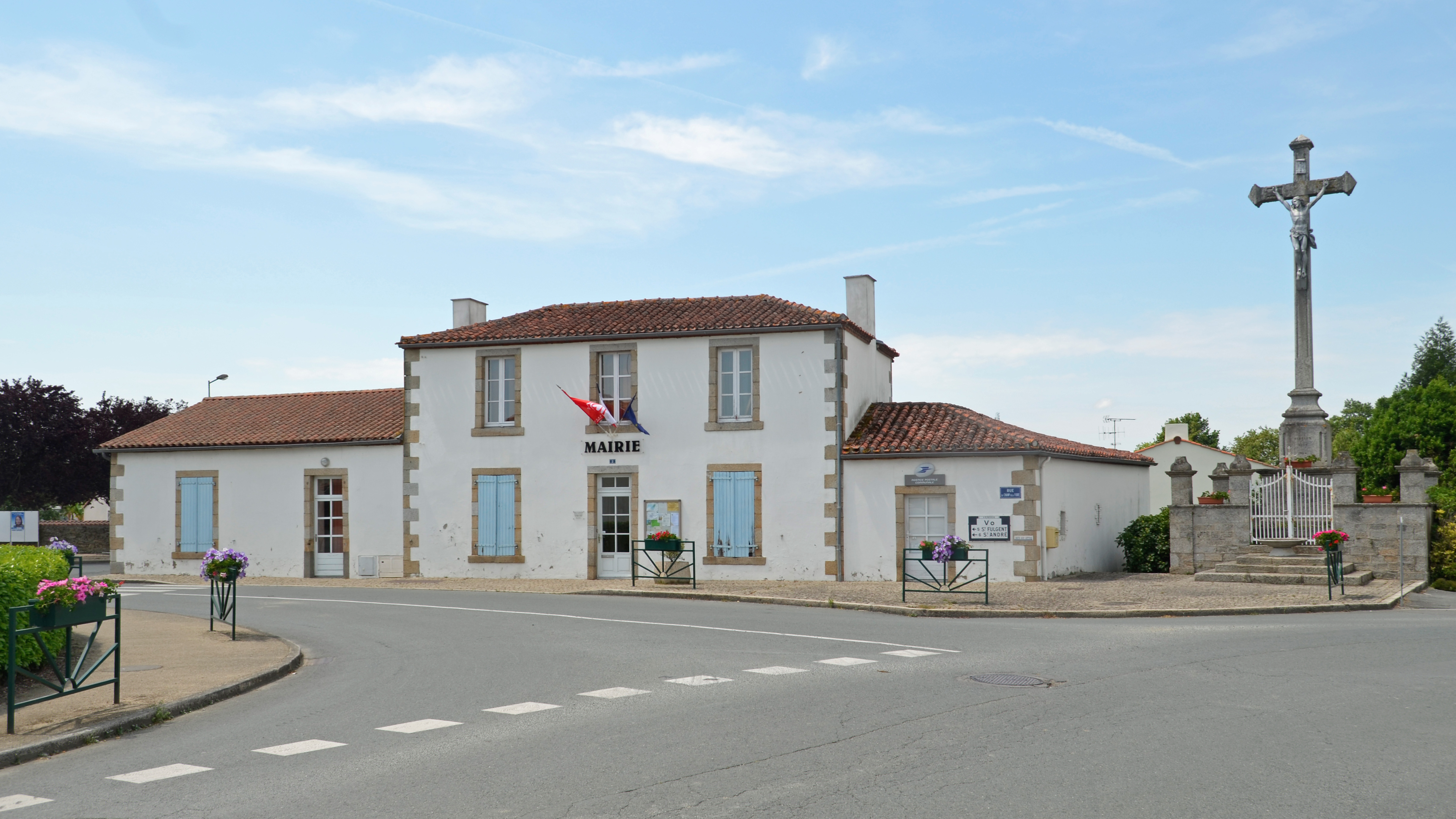
- The town hall and the calvary in Vendrennes
- Location of Vendrennes
- Location within France Location within Pays de la Loire
- Coordinates: 46°49′34″N 1°07′22″W
- Country: France
- Region: Pays de la Loire
- Department: Vendée
- Arrondissement: La Roche-sur-Yon
- Canton: Montaigu-Vendée
- Intercommunality: Pays des Herbiers

Government
  - Mayor (2020–2026): Roseline Phlipart
- Area^{1}: 16.92 km^{2} (6.53 sq mi)
- Highest elevation: 111 m (364 ft)
- Lowest elevation: 68 m (223 ft)
- Population (2023): 1,799
  - Density: 106.3/km^{2} (275.4/sq mi)
- Time zone: UTC+01:00 (CET)
  - Summer (DST): UTC+02:00 (CEST)
- INSEE/Postal code: 85301 /85250
- ^{1} French Land Register data, which excludes lakes, ponds, glaciers > 1 km^{2} (0.386 sq mi or 247 acres) and river estuaries.

Vendrennes (French pronunciation: [vɑ̃dʁɛn]) is a commune in the Vendée department in the Pays de la Loire region in western France.

== See also ==
- Communes of the Vendée department
