= Chauché =

- Commune
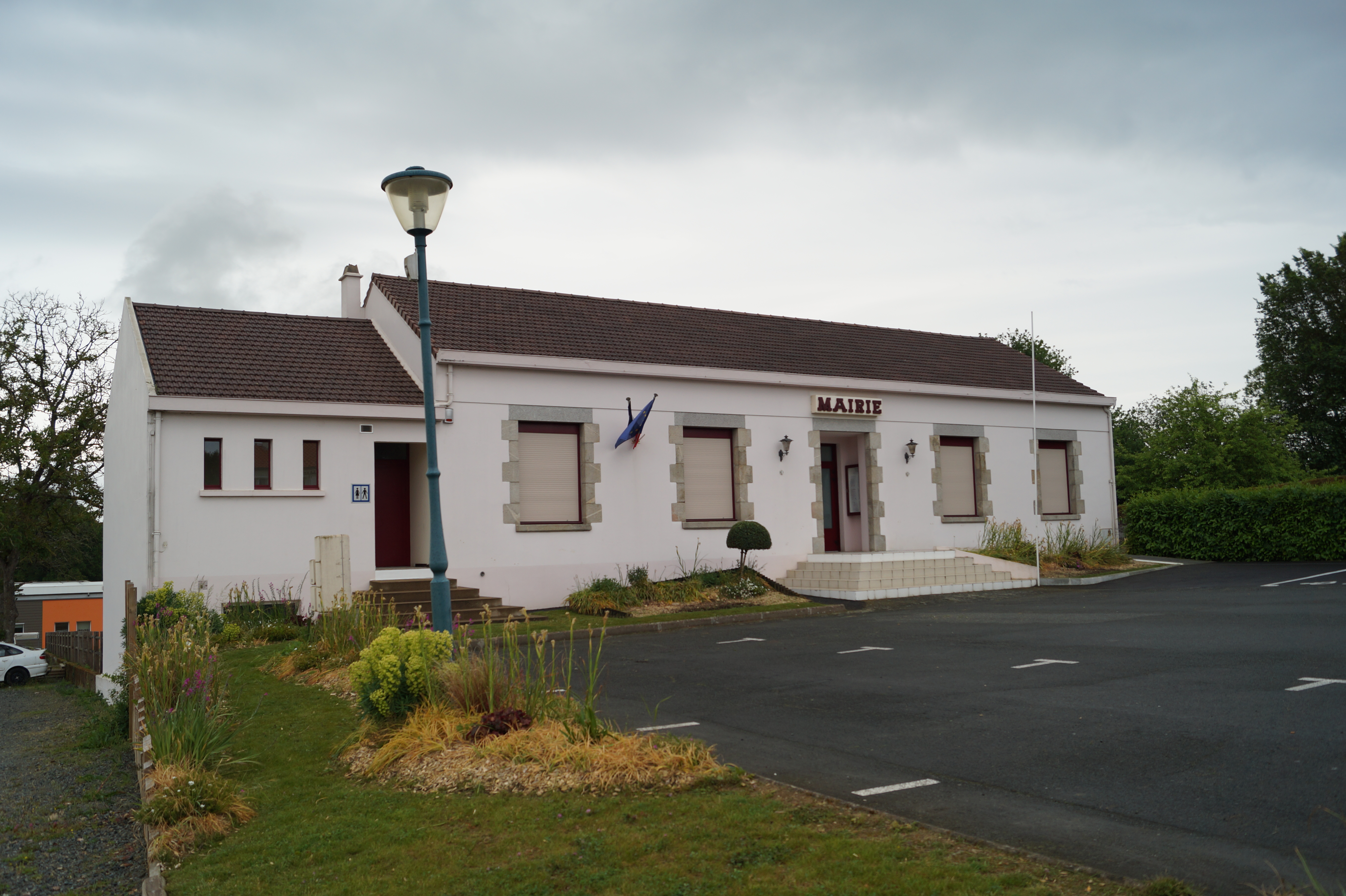

- Coat of arms
- Location of Chauché
- Location within France Location within Pays de la Loire
- Coordinates: 46°49′48″N 1°16′19″W
- Country: France
- Region: Pays de la Loire
- Department: Vendée
- Arrondissement: La Roche-sur-Yon
- Canton: Montaigu-Vendée
- Intercommunality: Pays de Saint-Fulgent - Les Essarts

Government
  - Mayor (2020–2026): Christian Merlet
- Area^{1}: 41.99 km^{2} (16.21 sq mi)
- Highest elevation: 101 m (331 ft)
- Lowest elevation: 49 m (161 ft)
- Population (2023): 2,613
  - Density: 62.23/km^{2} (161.2/sq mi)
- Time zone: UTC+01:00 (CET)
  - Summer (DST): UTC+02:00 (CEST)
- INSEE/Postal code: 85064 /85140
- ^{1} French Land Register data, which excludes lakes, ponds, glaciers > 1 km^{2} (0.386 sq mi or 247 acres) and river estuaries.

Chauché (French pronunciation: [ʃoʃe]) is a commune of the Vendée department in the Pays de la Loire region in western France.

== Population ==
Historical population
Year	Pop.	±% p.a.
1968	1,707	—
1975	1,633	−0.63%
1982	1,728	+0.81%
1990	1,813	+0.60%
1999	1,926	+0.67%
2007	2,159	+1.44%
2012	2,373	+1.91%
2017	2,470	+0.80%
2023	2,613	+0.94%
Source: INSEE

== See also ==
- Communes of the Vendée department
