= Sainte-Cécile, Vendée =

Sainte-Cécile
- Commune
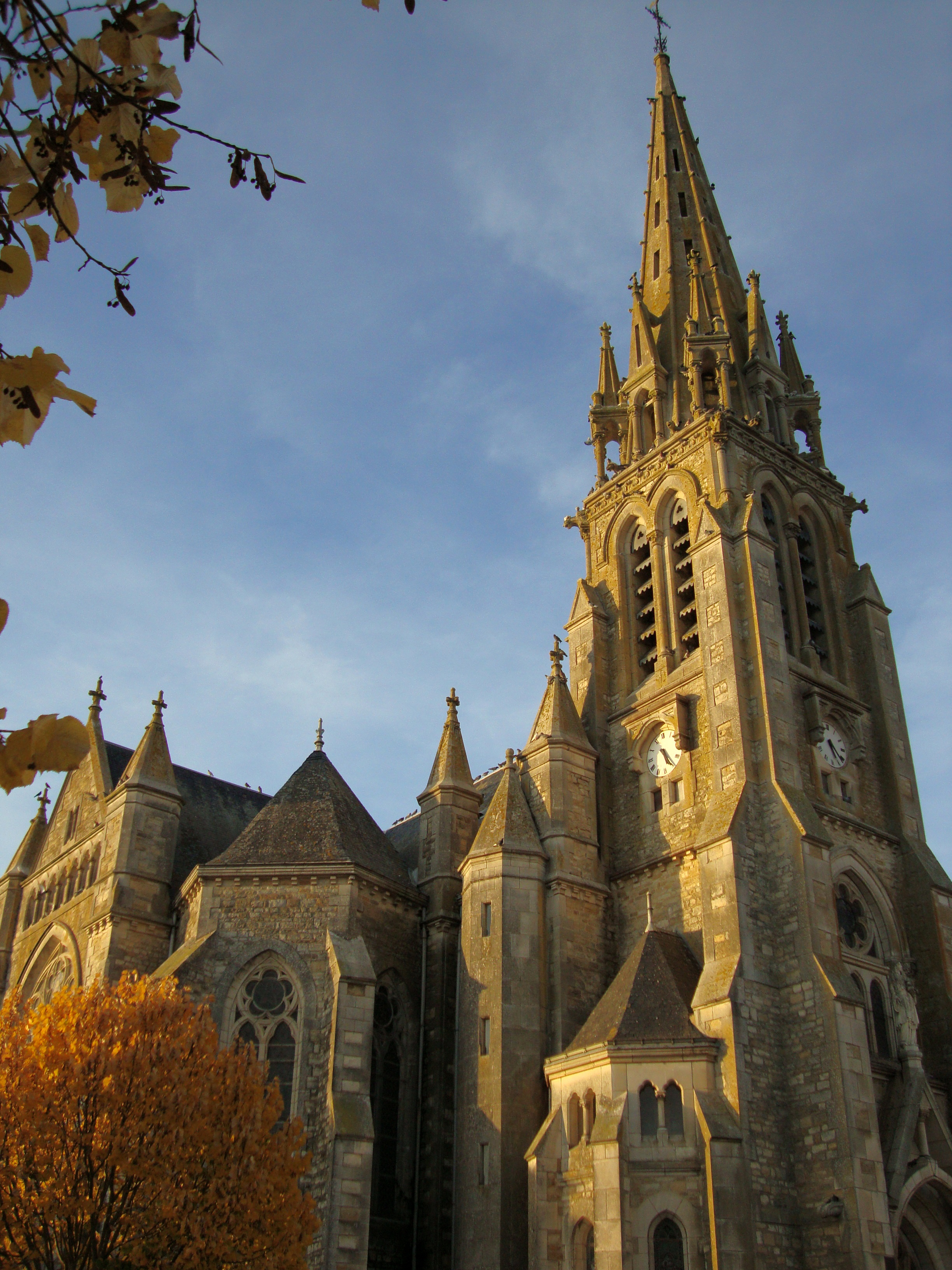
- The church in Sainte-Cécile

- Coat of arms
- Location of Sainte-Cécile
- Location within France Location within Pays de la Loire
- Coordinates: 46°44′42″N 1°06′46″W
- Country: France
- Region: Pays de la Loire
- Department: Vendée
- Arrondissement: La Roche-sur-Yon
- Canton: Chantonnay

Government
  - Mayor (2020–2026): Cyrille Guibert
- Area^{1}: 32.73 km^{2} (12.64 sq mi)
- Highest elevation: 107 m (351 ft)
- Lowest elevation: 37 m (121 ft)
- Population (2023): 1,575
  - Density: 48.12/km^{2} (124.6/sq mi)
- Time zone: UTC+01:00 (CET)
  - Summer (DST): UTC+02:00 (CEST)
- INSEE/Postal code: 85202 /85110
- ^{1} French Land Register data, which excludes lakes, ponds, glaciers > 1 km^{2} (0.386 sq mi or 247 acres) and river estuaries.

Sainte-Cécile (French pronunciation: [sɛ̃t sesil]) is a commune in the Vendée department in the Pays de la Loire region in western France.

== See also ==
- Communes of the Vendée department
