= La Merlatière =

- Commune
- Location of La Merlatière
- Location within France Location within Pays de la Loire
- Coordinates: 46°46′09″N 1°17′59″W
- Country: France
- Region: Pays de la Loire
- Department: Vendée
- Arrondissement: La Roche-sur-Yon
- Canton: Chantonnay
- Intercommunality: Pays de Saint-Fulgent - Les Essarts

Government
  - Mayor (2020–2026): Philippe Bely
- Area^{1}: 14.86 km^{2} (5.74 sq mi)
- Highest elevation: 106 m (348 ft)
- Lowest elevation: 69 m (226 ft)
- Population (2023): 1,009
  - Density: 67.90/km^{2} (175.9/sq mi)
- Time zone: UTC+01:00 (CET)
  - Summer (DST): UTC+02:00 (CEST)
- INSEE/Postal code: 85142 /85140
- ^{1} French Land Register data, which excludes lakes, ponds, glaciers > 1 km^{2} (0.386 sq mi or 247 acres) and river estuaries.

La Merlatière (French: [la mɛʁlatjɛʁ]) is a commune in the Vendée department in the Pays de la Loire region in western France.

== See also ==
- Communes of the Vendée department
