= Bazoges-en-Paillers =

- Commune
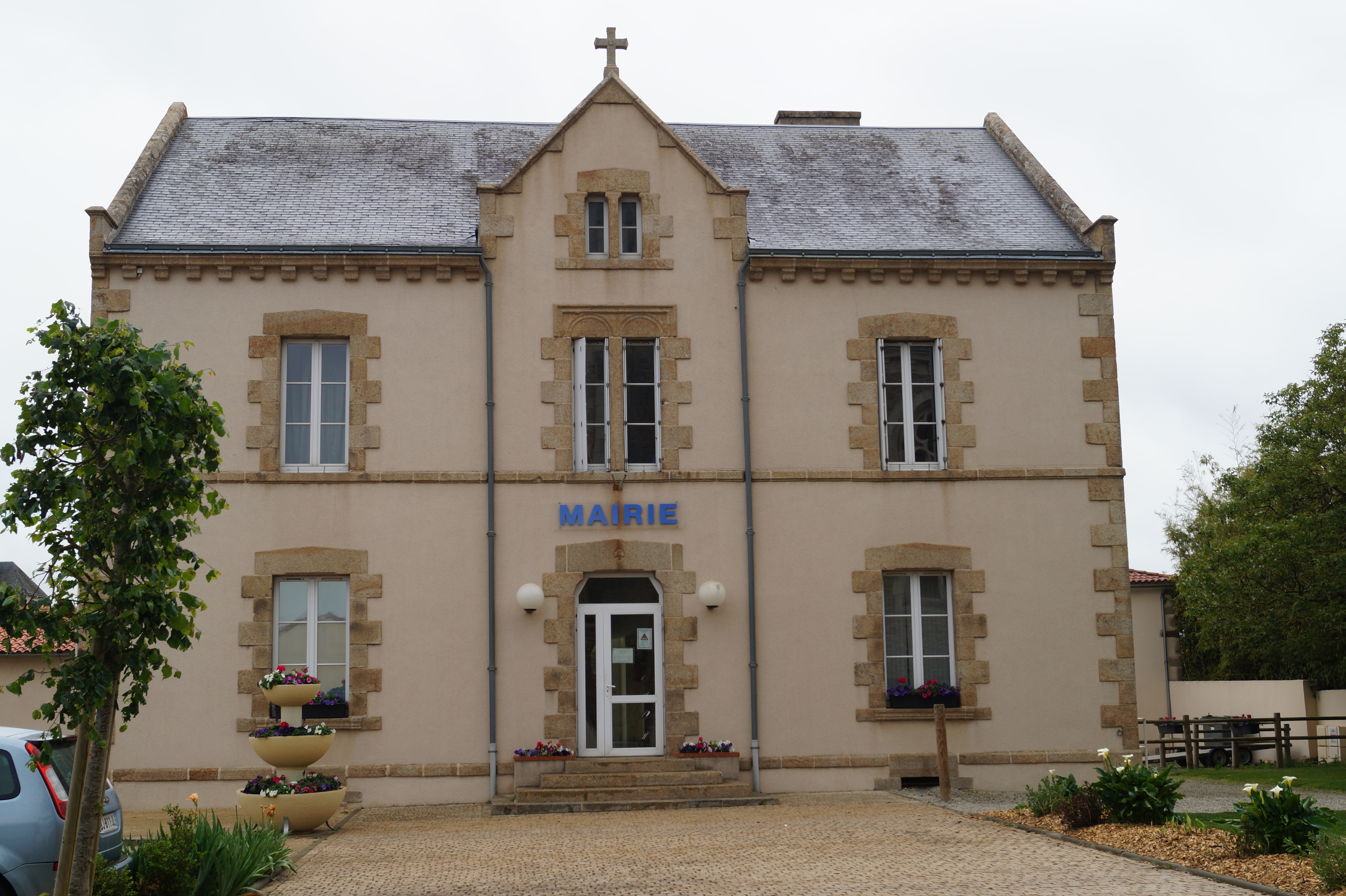
- Town hall of Bazoges-en-Paillers
- Location of Bazoges-en-Paillers
- Location within France Location within Pays de la Loire
- Coordinates: 46°54′29″N 1°07′58″W
- Country: France
- Region: Pays de la Loire
- Department: Vendée
- Arrondissement: La Roche-sur-Yon
- Canton: Montaigu-Vendée

Government
  - Mayor (2020–2026): Jean-François You
- Area^{1}: 11.45 km^{2} (4.42 sq mi)
- Elevation: 80 m (260 ft)
- Highest elevation: 107 m (351 ft)
- Lowest elevation: 53 m (174 ft)
- Population (2023): 1,555
  - Density: 135.8/km^{2} (351.7/sq mi)
- Time zone: UTC+01:00 (CET)
  - Summer (DST): UTC+02:00 (CEST)
- INSEE/Postal code: 85013 /85130
- ^{1} French Land Register data, which excludes lakes, ponds, glaciers > 1 km^{2} (0.386 sq mi or 247 acres) and river estuaries.

Bazoges-en-Paillers (French pronunciation: [bazɔʒ ɑ̃ paje]) is a commune in the Vendée department in the Pays de la Loire region in western France.

== See also ==
- Communes of the Vendée department
