= Saint-Hilaire-le-Vouhis =

- Commune
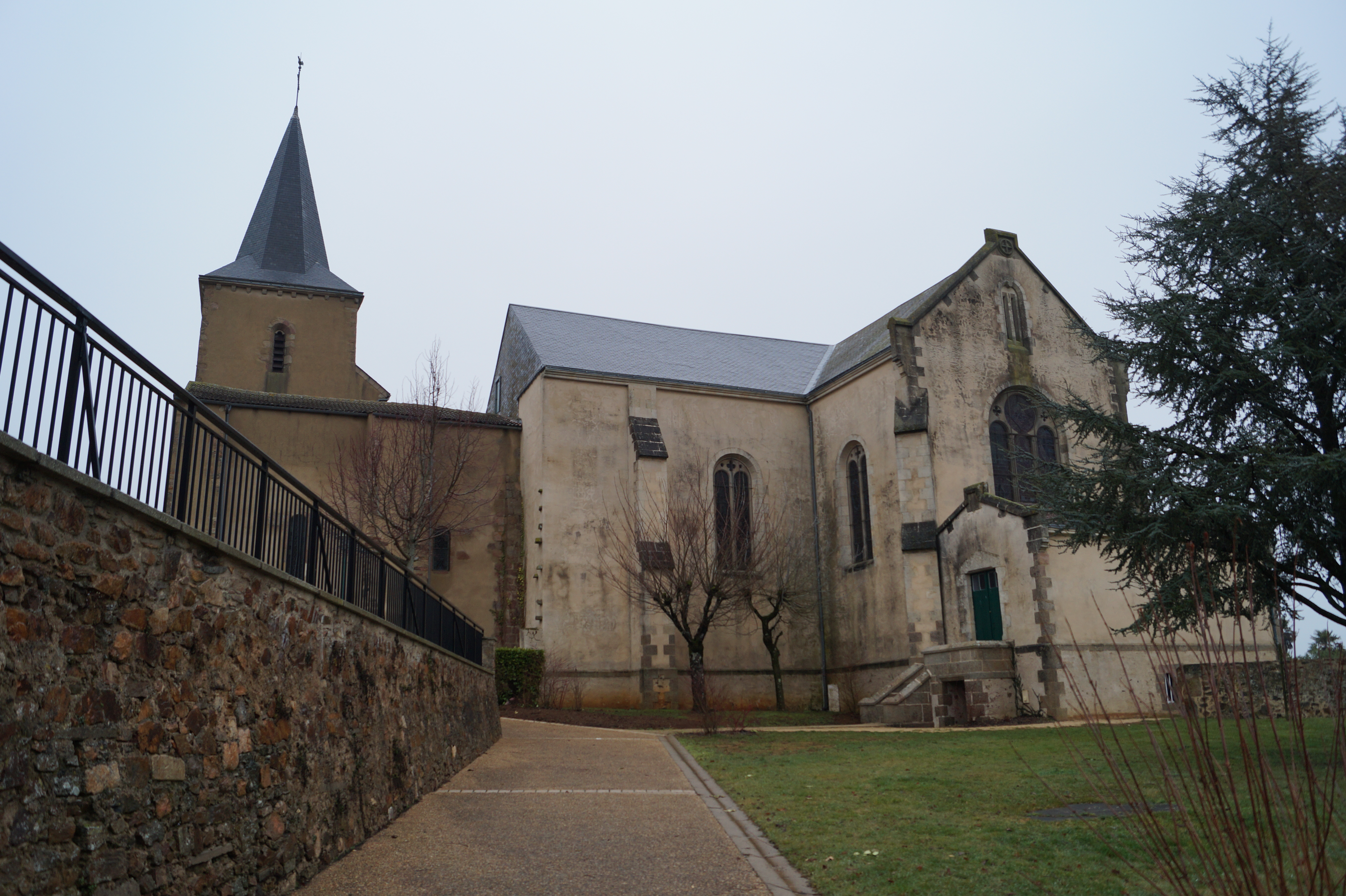

- Coat of arms
- Location of Saint-Hilaire-le-Vouhis
- Location within France Location within Pays de la Loire
- Coordinates: 46°41′19″N 1°07′45″W
- Country: France
- Region: Pays de la Loire
- Department: Vendée
- Arrondissement: La Roche-sur-Yon
- Canton: Chantonnay

Government
  - Mayor (2022–2026): Jean-Louis Cornière
- Area^{1}: 28.91 km^{2} (11.16 sq mi)
- Highest elevation: 109 m (358 ft)
- Lowest elevation: 29 m (95 ft)
- Population (2023): 1,101
  - Density: 38.08/km^{2} (98.64/sq mi)
- Time zone: UTC+01:00 (CET)
  - Summer (DST): UTC+02:00 (CEST)
- INSEE/Postal code: 85232 /85480
- ^{1} French Land Register data, which excludes lakes, ponds, glaciers > 1 km^{2} (0.386 sq mi or 247 acres) and river estuaries.

Saint-Hilaire-le-Vouhis (French pronunciation: [sɛ̃.t‿ilɛʁ lə vu.i]) is a commune in the Vendée department in the Pays de la Loire region in western France.

== See also ==
- Communes of the Vendée department
