= Saint-Germain-de-Prinçay =

- Commune
- Coat of arms
- Location of Saint-Germain-de-Prinçay
- Location within France Location within Pays de la Loire
- Coordinates: 46°43′18″N 1°01′14″W
- Country: France
- Region: Pays de la Loire
- Department: Vendée
- Arrondissement: La Roche-sur-Yon
- Canton: Chantonnay
- Intercommunality: Pays de Chantonnay

Government
  - Mayor (2020–2026): Dominique Paillat
- Area^{1}: 24.34 km^{2} (9.40 sq mi)
- Highest elevation: 98 m (322 ft)
- Lowest elevation: 51 m (167 ft)
- Population (2023): 1,640
  - Density: 67.4/km^{2} (175/sq mi)
- Time zone: UTC+01:00 (CET)
  - Summer (DST): UTC+02:00 (CEST)
- INSEE/Postal code: 85220 /85110
- ^{1} French Land Register data, which excludes lakes, ponds, glaciers > 1 km^{2} (0.386 sq mi or 247 acres) and river estuaries.

Saint-Germain-de-Prinçay (French pronunciation: [sɛ̃ ʒɛʁmɛ̃ də pʁɛ̃sɛ]) is a commune in the Vendée department in the Pays de la Loire region in western France.

== See also ==
- Communes of the Vendée department
