= Le Boupère =

- Commune
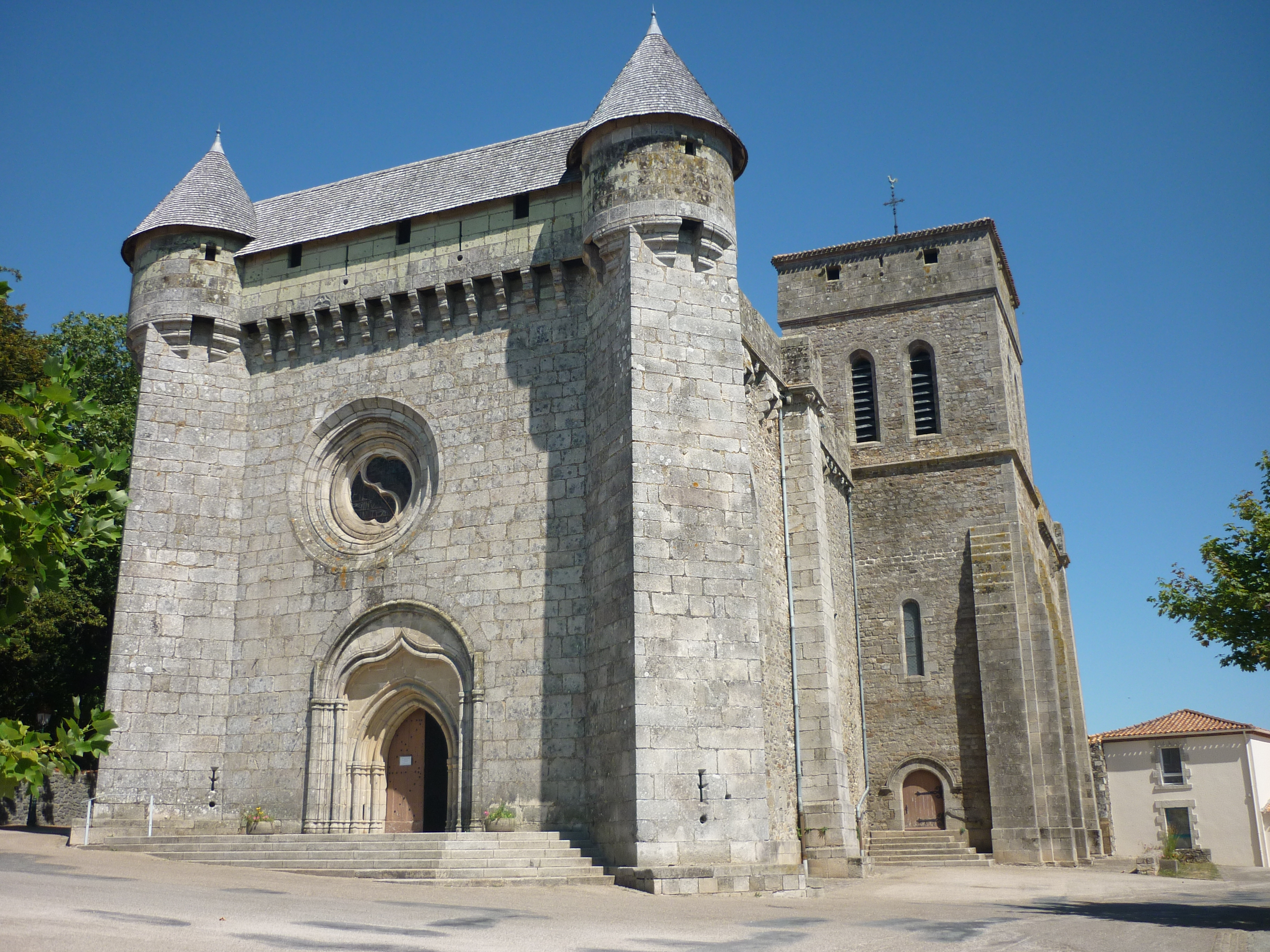
- Fortified church of Saint-Pierre, in Le Boupère

- Coat of arms
- Location of Le Boupère
- Location within France Location within Pays de la Loire
- Coordinates: 46°47′44″N 0°55′31″W
- Country: France
- Region: Pays de la Loire
- Department: Vendée
- Arrondissement: Fontenay-le-Comte
- Canton: Chantonnay
- Intercommunality: Pays de Pouzauges

Government
  - Mayor (2020–2026): Anne Bizon
- Area^{1}: 43.48 km^{2} (16.79 sq mi)
- Highest elevation: 155 m (509 ft)
- Lowest elevation: 67 m (220 ft)
- Population (2023): 3,151
  - Density: 72.47/km^{2} (187.7/sq mi)
- Time zone: UTC+01:00 (CET)
  - Summer (DST): UTC+02:00 (CEST)
- INSEE/Postal code: 85031 /85510
- ^{1} French Land Register data, which excludes lakes, ponds, glaciers > 1 km^{2} (0.386 sq mi or 247 acres) and river estuaries.

Le Boupère (French pronunciation: [lə bupɛʁ]) is a commune in the Vendée department in the Pays de la Loire region in western France.

== Geography ==
The river Lay forms all of the commune's southern border.

== Population ==
Historical population
Year	Pop.	±% p.a.
1968	2,523	—
1975	2,762	+1.30%
1982	2,892	+0.66%
1990	2,832	−0.26%
1999	2,764	−0.27%
2007	2,856	+0.41%
2012	3,070	+1.46%
2017	3,150	+0.52%
2023	3,151	+0.01%
Source: INSEE

== See also ==
- Communes of the Vendée department
