= La Rabatelière =

- Commune
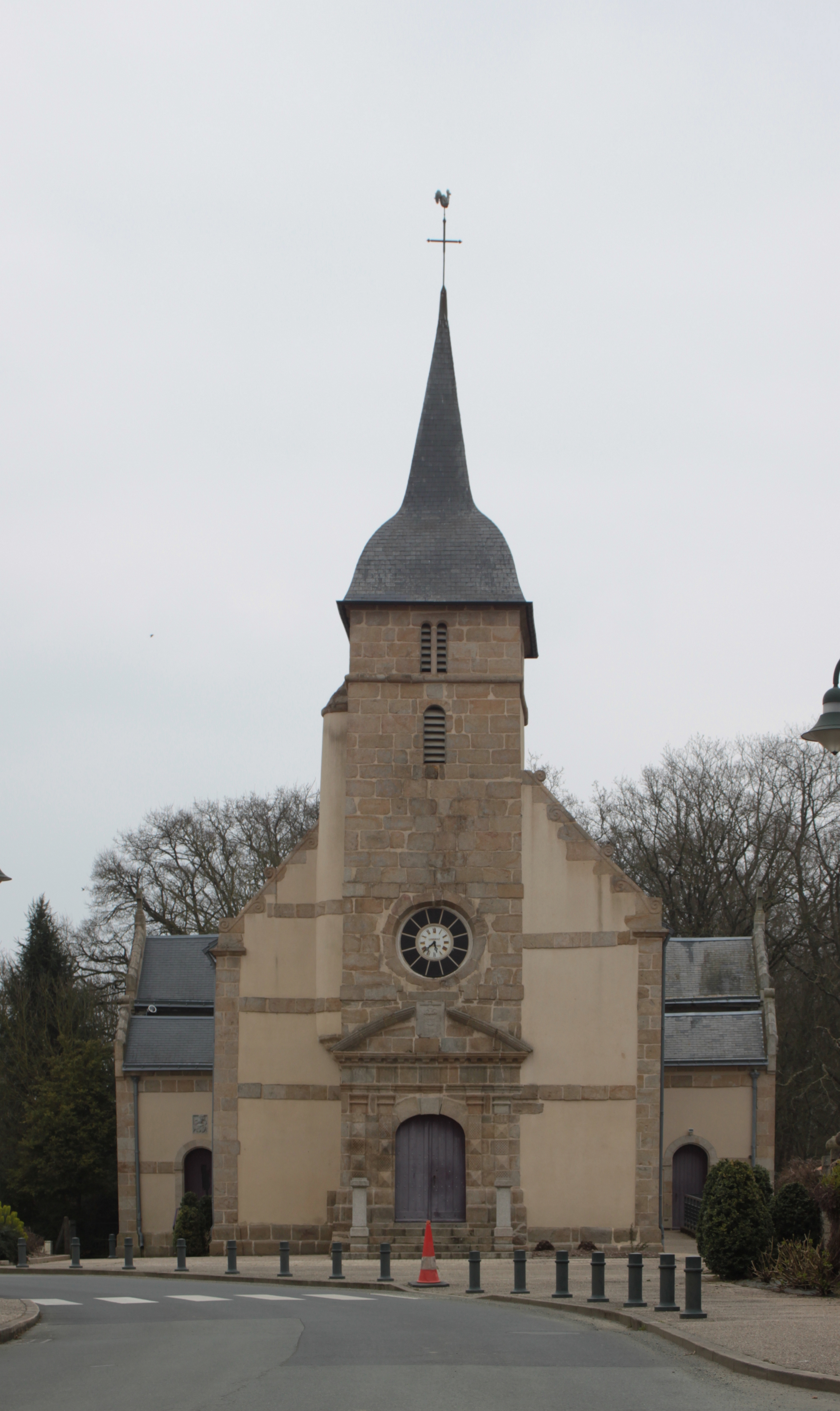
- The church in La Rabatelière

- Coat of arms
- Location of La Rabatelière
- Location within France Location within Pays de la Loire
- Coordinates: 46°51′44″N 1°15′33″W
- Country: France
- Region: Pays de la Loire
- Department: Vendée
- Arrondissement: La Roche-sur-Yon
- Canton: Montaigu-Vendée
- Intercommunality: Pays de Saint-Fulgent - Les Essarts

Government
  - Mayor (2020–2026): Jérôme Carvalho
- Area^{1}: 8.26 km^{2} (3.19 sq mi)
- Highest elevation: 77 m (253 ft)
- Lowest elevation: 42 m (138 ft)
- Population (2023): 1,024
  - Density: 124/km^{2} (321/sq mi)
- Time zone: UTC+01:00 (CET)
  - Summer (DST): UTC+02:00 (CEST)
- INSEE/Postal code: 85186 /85250
- ^{1} French Land Register data, which excludes lakes, ponds, glaciers > 1 km^{2} (0.386 sq mi or 247 acres) and river estuaries.

La Rabatelière (French pronunciation: [la ʁabat(ə)ljɛʁ]) is a commune in the Vendée department in the Pays de la Loire region in western France.

== See also ==
- Communes of the Vendée department
