= La Boissière-de-Montaigu =

- Commune
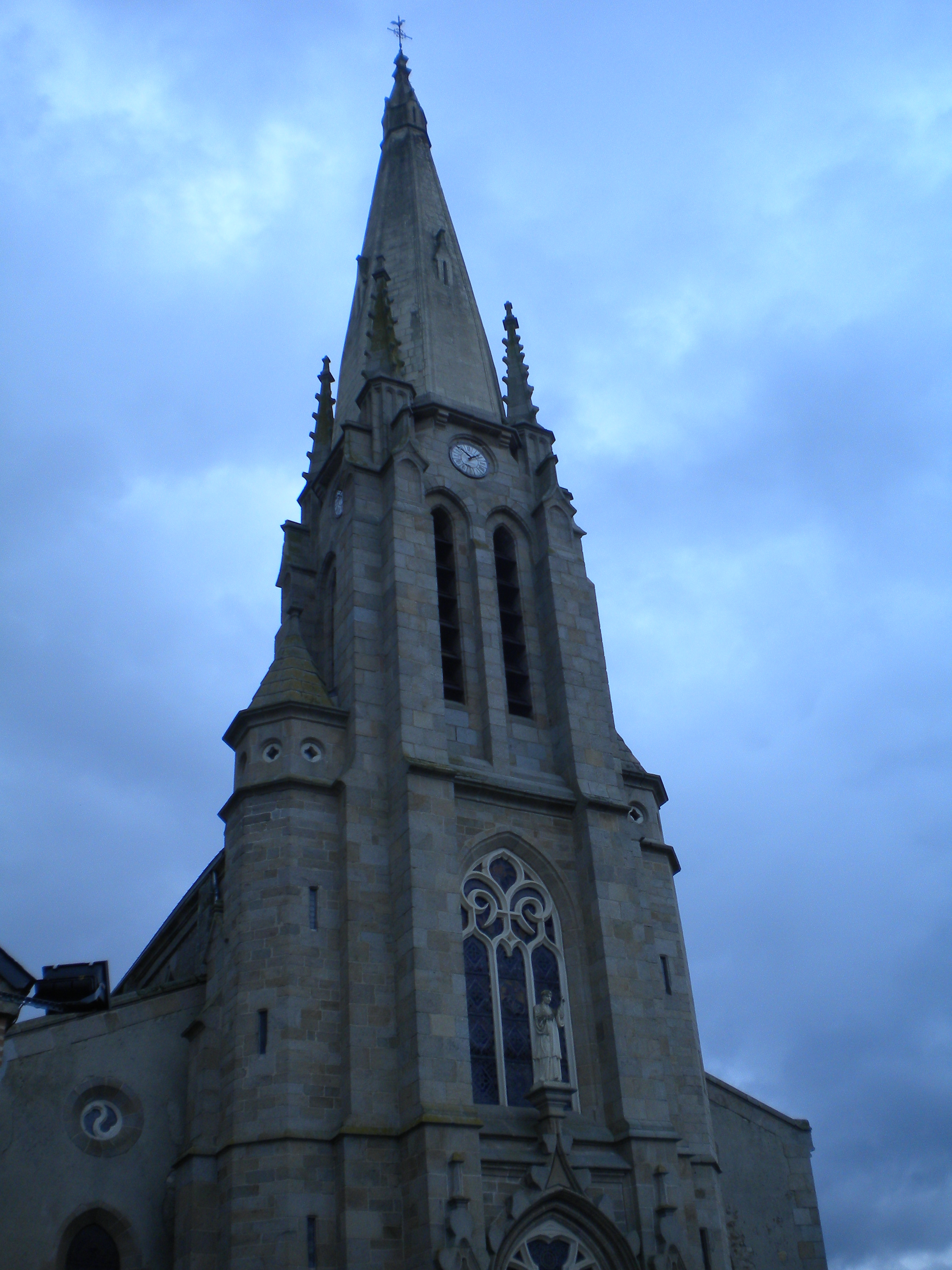
- The church of Our Lady of the Assumption, in La Boissière-de-Montaigu

- Coat of arms
- Location of La Boissière-de-Montaigu
- Location within France Location within Pays de la Loire
- Coordinates: 46°57′06″N 1°11′24″W
- Country: France
- Region: Pays de la Loire
- Department: Vendée
- Arrondissement: La Roche-sur-Yon
- Canton: Montaigu-Vendée
- Intercommunality: CA Terres de Montaigu

Government
  - Mayor (2020–2026): Anthony Bonnet
- Area^{1}: 29.1 km^{2} (11.2 sq mi)
- Elevation: 84 m (276 ft)
- Highest elevation: 97 m (318 ft)
- Lowest elevation: 35 m (115 ft)
- Population (2023): 2,311
  - Density: 79.4/km^{2} (206/sq mi)
- Time zone: UTC+01:00 (CET)
  - Summer (DST): UTC+02:00 (CEST)
- INSEE/Postal code: 85025 /85600
- ^{1} French Land Register data, which excludes lakes, ponds, glaciers > 1 km^{2} (0.386 sq mi or 247 acres) and river estuaries.

La Boissière-de-Montaigu (French pronunciation: [la bwasjɛʁ də mɔ̃tɛɡy], literally La Boissière of Montaigu) is a commune in the Vendée department in the Pays de la Loire region in western France.

== History ==
Within the border of the commune, axes, potteries and engraved rocks attest to the presence of man between 3500 and 2800 BC.

== Places of interest ==
Château d' Asson: 15th and 18th centuries. Devastated during the War of Vendée.

== Demography ==
Historical population

Year	Pop.	±% p.a.
1800	360	—
1806	847	+15.33%
1821	1,055	+1.47%
1831	1,109	+0.50%
1836	1,127	+0.32%
1841	1,133	+0.11%
1846	1,221	+1.51%
1851	1,276	+0.89%
1856	1,324	+0.74%
1861	1,398	+1.09%
1866	1,496	+1.36%
1872	1,507	+0.12%
1876	1,606	+1.60%
1881	1,533	−0.93%
1886	1,607	+0.95%
1891	1,567	−0.50%
1896	1,531	−0.46%
1901	1,561	+0.39%

Year	Pop.	±% p.a.
1906	1,583	+0.28%
1911	1,515	−0.87%
1921	1,404	−0.76%
1926	1,381	−0.33%
1931	1,388	+0.10%
1936	1,390	+0.03%
1946	1,344	−0.34%
1954	1,334	−0.09%
1962	1,453	+1.07%
1968	1,383	−0.82%
1975	1,430	+0.48%
1982	1,500	+0.69%
1990	1,584	+0.68%
1999	1,568	−0.11%
2007	1,957	+2.81%
2012	2,200	+2.37%
2017	2,251	+0.46%
2023	2,311	+0.44%

Source: EHESS and INSEE (1968-2023)

== See also ==
- Communes of the Vendée department
