= Rochetrejoux =

- Commune
- Coat of arms
- Location of Rochetrejoux
- Location within France Location within Pays de la Loire
- Coordinates: 46°47′24″N 0°59′41″W
- Country: France
- Region: Pays de la Loire
- Department: Vendée
- Arrondissement: La Roche-sur-Yon
- Canton: Chantonnay

Government
  - Mayor (2020–2026): Christian Boissinot
- Area^{1}: 10.92 km^{2} (4.22 sq mi)
- Highest elevation: 128 m (420 ft)
- Lowest elevation: 62 m (203 ft)
- Population (2023): 983
  - Density: 90.0/km^{2} (233/sq mi)
- Time zone: UTC+01:00 (CET)
  - Summer (DST): UTC+02:00 (CEST)
- INSEE/Postal code: 85192 /85510
- ^{1} French Land Register data, which excludes lakes, ponds, glaciers > 1 km^{2} (0.386 sq mi or 247 acres) and river estuaries.

Rochetrejoux (French pronunciation: [ʁɔʃtʁəʒu]) is a commune in the Vendée department in the Pays de la Loire region in western France.

== See also ==
- Communes of the Vendée department
