= Saint-Prouant =

- Commune
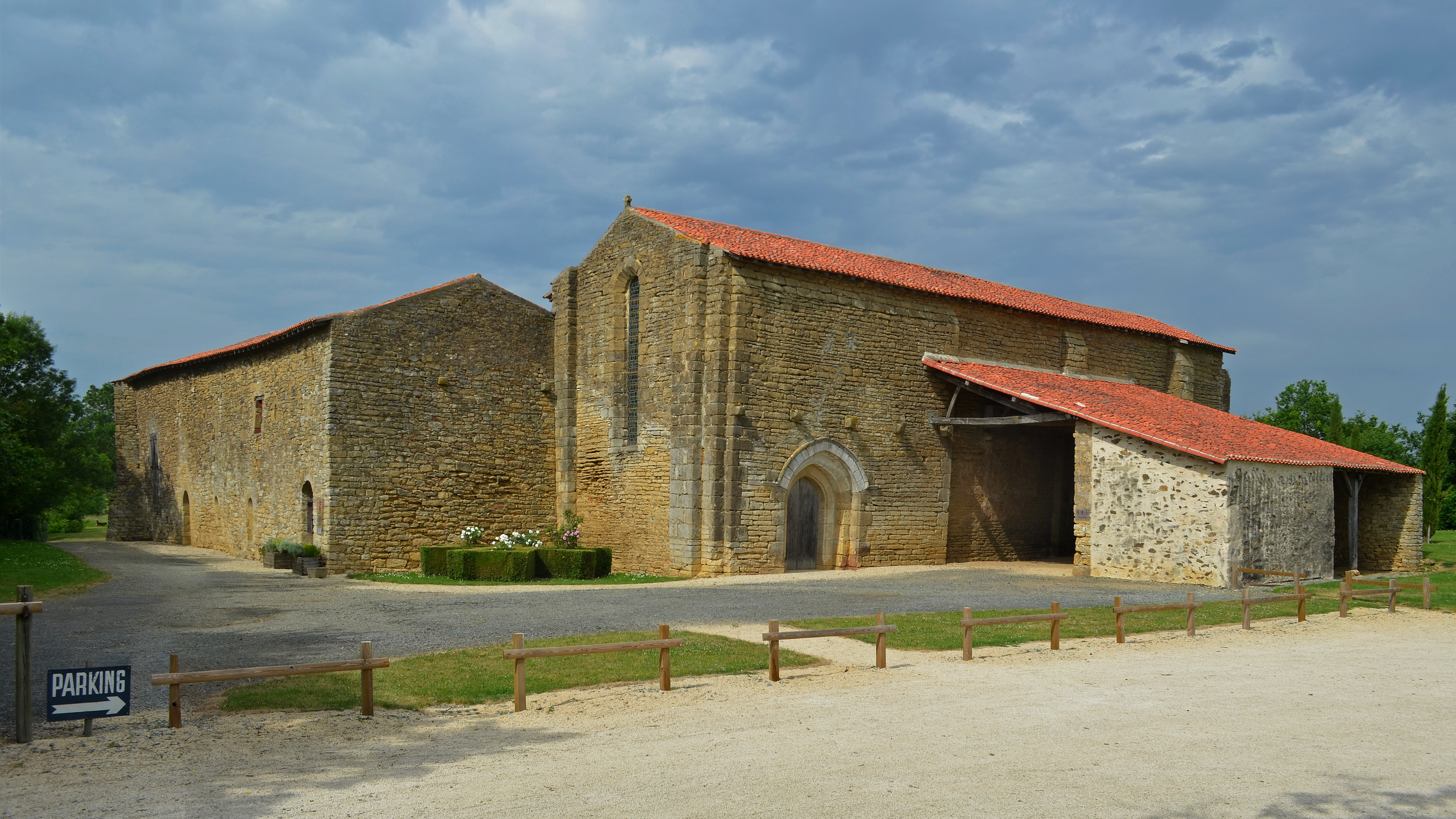
- Grammont priory, in Saint-Prouant

- Coat of arms
- Location of Saint-Prouant
- Location within France Location within Pays de la Loire
- Coordinates: 46°45′33″N 0°57′21″W
- Country: France
- Region: Pays de la Loire
- Department: Vendée
- Arrondissement: La Roche-sur-Yon
- Canton: Chantonnay

Government
  - Mayor (2020–2026): Yannick Soulard
- Area^{1}: 12.86 km^{2} (4.97 sq mi)
- Highest elevation: 118 m (387 ft)
- Lowest elevation: 54 m (177 ft)
- Population (2023): 1,666
  - Density: 129.5/km^{2} (335.5/sq mi)
- Time zone: UTC+01:00 (CET)
  - Summer (DST): UTC+02:00 (CEST)
- INSEE/Postal code: 85266 /85110
- ^{1} French Land Register data, which excludes lakes, ponds, glaciers > 1 km^{2} (0.386 sq mi or 247 acres) and river estuaries.

Saint-Prouant (French pronunciation: [sɛ̃ pʁuɑ̃]) is a commune in the Vendée department in the Pays de la Loire region in western France.

== Geography ==
The river Lay forms all of the commune's eastern border.

== Monuments ==
- Grammont priory.

== See also ==
- Communes of the Vendée department
