= La Copechagnière =

- Commune
- Coat of arms
- Location of La Copechagnière
- Location within France Location within Pays de la Loire
- Coordinates: 46°51′00″N 1°20′44″W
- Country: France
- Region: Pays de la Loire
- Department: Vendée
- Arrondissement: La Roche-sur-Yon
- Canton: Montaigu-Vendée
- Intercommunality: Pays de Saint-Fulgent - Les Essarts

Government
  - Mayor (2020–2026): Annie Nicolleau
- Area^{1}: 9.68 km^{2} (3.74 sq mi)
- Highest elevation: 82 m (269 ft)
- Lowest elevation: 64 m (210 ft)
- Population (2023): 1,046
  - Density: 108/km^{2} (280/sq mi)
- Time zone: UTC+01:00 (CET)
  - Summer (DST): UTC+02:00 (CEST)
- INSEE/Postal code: 85072 /85260
- ^{1} French Land Register data, which excludes lakes, ponds, glaciers > 1 km^{2} (0.386 sq mi or 247 acres) and river estuaries.

La Copechagnière (French pronunciation: [la kɔpʃaɲɛʁ]) is a commune of the Vendée department in the Pays de la Loire region in western France.

== See also ==
- Communes of the Vendée department
