= Chaillé-sous-les-Ormeaux =

- Part of Rives-de-l'Yon
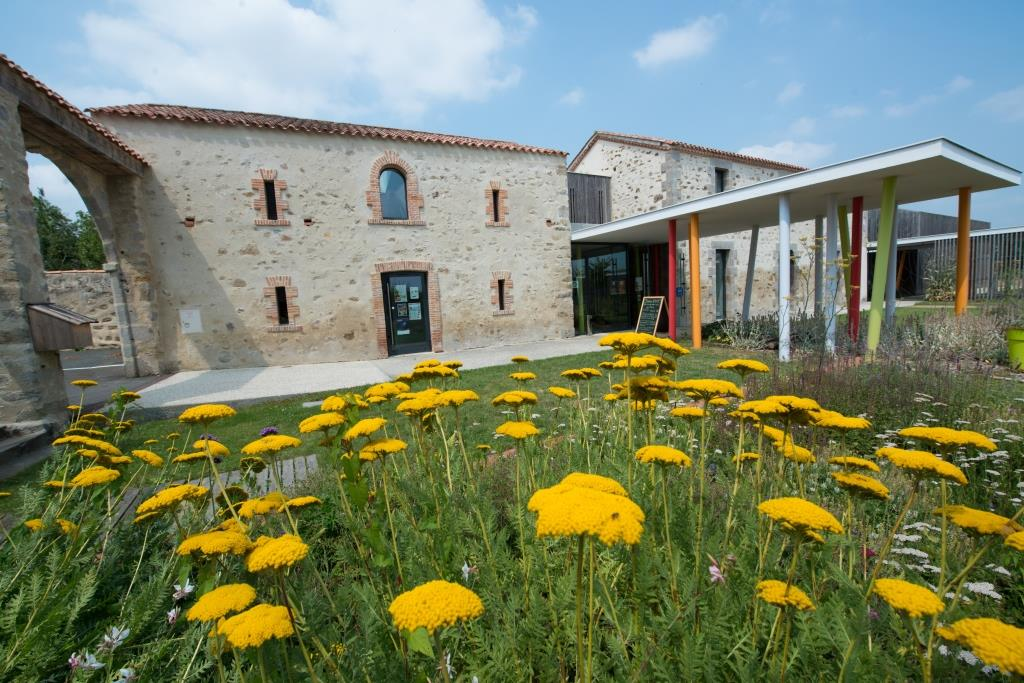
- The garden of the House of Dragonflies, in Chaillé-sous-les-Ormeaux
- Location of Chaillé-sous-les-Ormeaux
- Location within France Location within Pays de la Loire
- Coordinates: 46°35′03″N 1°22′02″W
- Country: France
- Region: Pays de la Loire
- Department: Vendée
- Arrondissement: La Roche-sur-Yon
- Canton: Mareuil-sur-Lay-Dissais
- Commune: Rives-de-l'Yon
- Area^{1}: 17.50 km^{2} (6.76 sq mi)
- Highest elevation: 77 m (253 ft)
- Lowest elevation: 6 m (20 ft)
- Population (2022): 1,379
  - Density: 78.80/km^{2} (204.1/sq mi)
- Time zone: UTC+01:00 (CET)
  - Summer (DST): UTC+02:00 (CEST)
- Postal code: 85310
- ^{1} French Land Register data, which excludes lakes, ponds, glaciers > 1 km^{2} (0.386 sq mi or 247 acres) and river estuaries.

Chaillé-sous-les-Ormeaux (French pronunciation: [ʃaje su le.z‿ɔʁmo]) is a former commune in the Vendée department in the Pays de la Loire region in western France. On 1 January 2016, it was merged into the new commune of Rives-de-l'Yon.

== Geography ==
The village lies above the right bank of the river Yon, which forms most of the commune's eastern border.

== See also ==
- Communes of the Vendée department
