= Communauté d'agglomération Terres de Montaigu =

Terres de Montaigu
- Communauté d'agglomération
- Interactive map of Terres de Montaigu
- Coordinates: 46°58′N 01°19′W
- Country: France
- Region: Pays de la Loire
- Department: Vendée
- No. of communes: {{{nbcomm}}}
- Established: 2017
- Area: 379.3 km^{2} (146.4 sq mi)
- Population (2019): 49,428
  - Density: 130.3/km^{2} (337.5/sq mi)
- Website: www.terresdemontaigu.fr

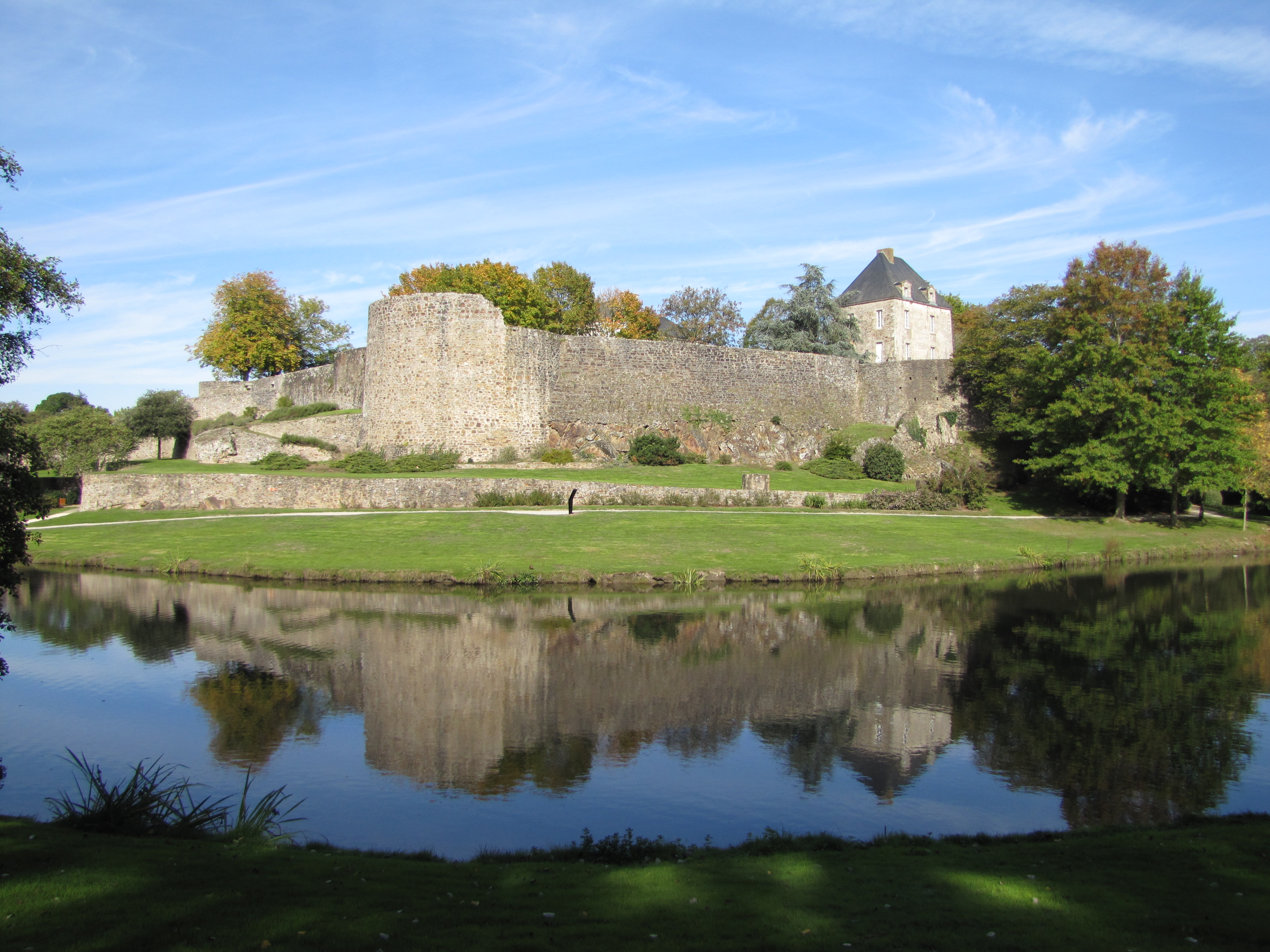
This building is indexed in the base Mérimée, a database of architectural heritage maintained by the French Ministry of Culture, under the reference PA85000042 .

Communauté d'agglomération Terres de Montaigu is the communauté d'agglomération, an intercommunal structure, centred on the town of Montaigu-Vendée. It is located in the Vendée department, in the Pays de la Loire region, western France. Created in 2017, its seat is in Montaigu-Vendée. Its area is 379.3 km^{2}. Its population was 49,428 in 2019, of which 20,424 in Montaigu-Vendée proper.

== Composition ==
The communauté d'agglomération consists of the following 9 communes:

1. La Boissière-de-Montaigu
2. La Bruffière
3. Cugand-la-Bernardière
4. L'Herbergement
5. Montaigu-Vendée
6. Montréverd
7. Rocheservière
8. Saint-Philbert-de-Bouaine
9. Treize-Septiers
