= Saint-Fulgent =

- Commune
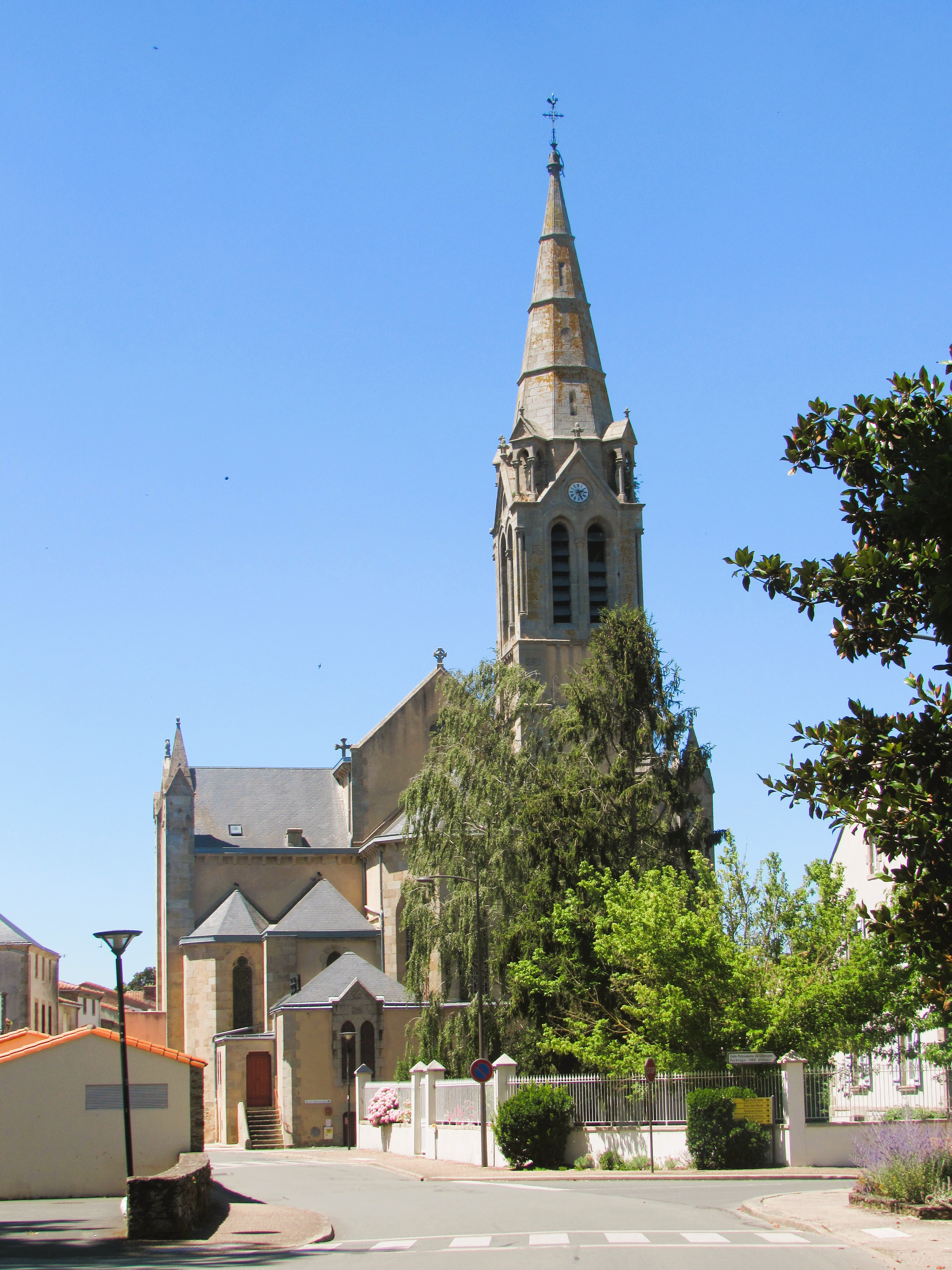

- Coat of arms
- Location of Saint-Fulgent
- Location within France Location within Pays de la Loire
- Coordinates: 46°51′14″N 1°10′36″W
- Country: France
- Region: Pays de la Loire
- Department: Vendée
- Arrondissement: La Roche-sur-Yon
- Canton: Montaigu-Vendée
- Intercommunality: Pays de Saint-Fulgent - Les Essarts

Government
  - Mayor (2020–2026): Jean-Luc Gautron
- Area^{1}: 36.82 km^{2} (14.22 sq mi)
- Highest elevation: 106 m (348 ft)
- Lowest elevation: 46 m (151 ft)
- Population (2023): 3,994
  - Density: 108.5/km^{2} (280.9/sq mi)
- Time zone: UTC+01:00 (CET)
  - Summer (DST): UTC+02:00 (CEST)
- INSEE/Postal code: 85215 /85250
- ^{1} French Land Register data, which excludes lakes, ponds, glaciers > 1 km^{2} (0.386 sq mi or 247 acres) and river estuaries.

Saint-Fulgent (French pronunciation: [sɛ̃ fylʒɑ̃]) is a commune in the Vendée department in the Pays de la Loire region in western France.

== Geography ==
=== Climate ===
Saint-Fulgent has an oceanic climate (Köppen climate classification Cfb). The average annual temperature in Saint-Fulgent is 12.6 °C (54.7 °F). The average annual rainfall is 815.9 mm (32.12 in) with December as the wettest month. The temperatures are highest on average in July, at around 19.7 °C (67.5 °F), and lowest in January, at around 5.9 °C (42.6 °F). The highest temperature ever recorded in Saint-Fulgent was 41.3 °C (106.3 °F) on 18 July 2022; the coldest temperature ever recorded was −11.1 °C (12.0 °F) on 12 February 2012.

Climate data for Saint-Fulgent (1991−2020 normals, extremes 2007−present)
Month	Jan	Feb	Mar	Apr	May	Jun	Jul	Aug	Sep	Oct	Nov	Dec	Year
Record high °C (°F)	16.2 (61.2)	23.8 (74.8)	24.6 (76.3)	27.8 (82.0)	33.1 (91.6)	39.3 (102.7)	41.3 (106.3)	39.4 (102.9)	34.2 (93.6)	31.2 (88.2)	22.0 (71.6)	17.5 (63.5)	41.3 (106.3)
Mean daily maximum °C (°F)	9.4 (48.9)	10.9 (51.6)	13.7 (56.7)	17.6 (63.7)	20.4 (68.7)	23.7 (74.7)	26.0 (78.8)	25.9 (78.6)	23.3 (73.9)	18.3 (64.9)	13.4 (56.1)	10.3 (50.5)	17.7 (63.9)
Daily mean °C (°F)	5.9 (42.6)	6.6 (43.9)	8.7 (47.7)	11.6 (52.9)	14.6 (58.3)	18.0 (64.4)	19.7 (67.5)	19.4 (66.9)	16.8 (62.2)	13.3 (55.9)	9.4 (48.9)	6.6 (43.9)	12.6 (54.7)
Mean daily minimum °C (°F)	2.5 (36.5)	2.3 (36.1)	3.6 (38.5)	5.6 (42.1)	8.9 (48.0)	12.2 (54.0)	13.4 (56.1)	12.9 (55.2)	10.4 (50.7)	8.4 (47.1)	5.5 (41.9)	2.9 (37.2)	7.4 (45.3)
Record low °C (°F)	−9.8 (14.4)	−11.1 (12.0)	−5.3 (22.5)	−4.1 (24.6)	−1.3 (29.7)	3.5 (38.3)	5.6 (42.1)	5.1 (41.2)	0.4 (32.7)	−2.6 (27.3)	−8.3 (17.1)	−8.4 (16.9)	−11.1 (12.0)
Average precipitation mm (inches)	93.3 (3.67)	66.6 (2.62)	70.0 (2.76)	60.2 (2.37)	63.4 (2.50)	63.2 (2.49)	42.8 (1.69)	48.0 (1.89)	47.0 (1.85)	72.6 (2.86)	89.2 (3.51)	99.6 (3.92)	815.9 (32.12)
Average precipitation days (≥ 1.0 mm)	14.4	11.8	10.8	9.4	10.2	9.2	7.2	7.0	6.9	9.9	13.2	13.5	123.5
Source: Météo-France

== Population ==
Historical population
Year	Pop.	±% p.a.
1968	2,258	—
1975	2,599	+2.03%
1982	2,777	+0.95%
1990	2,932	+0.68%
1999	3,077	+0.54%
2007	3,385	+1.20%
2012	3,682	+1.70%
2017	3,792	+0.59%
2023	3,994	+0.87%
Source: INSEE

== See also ==
- Communes of the Vendée department
