= Saint-André-Goule-d'Oie =

- Commune
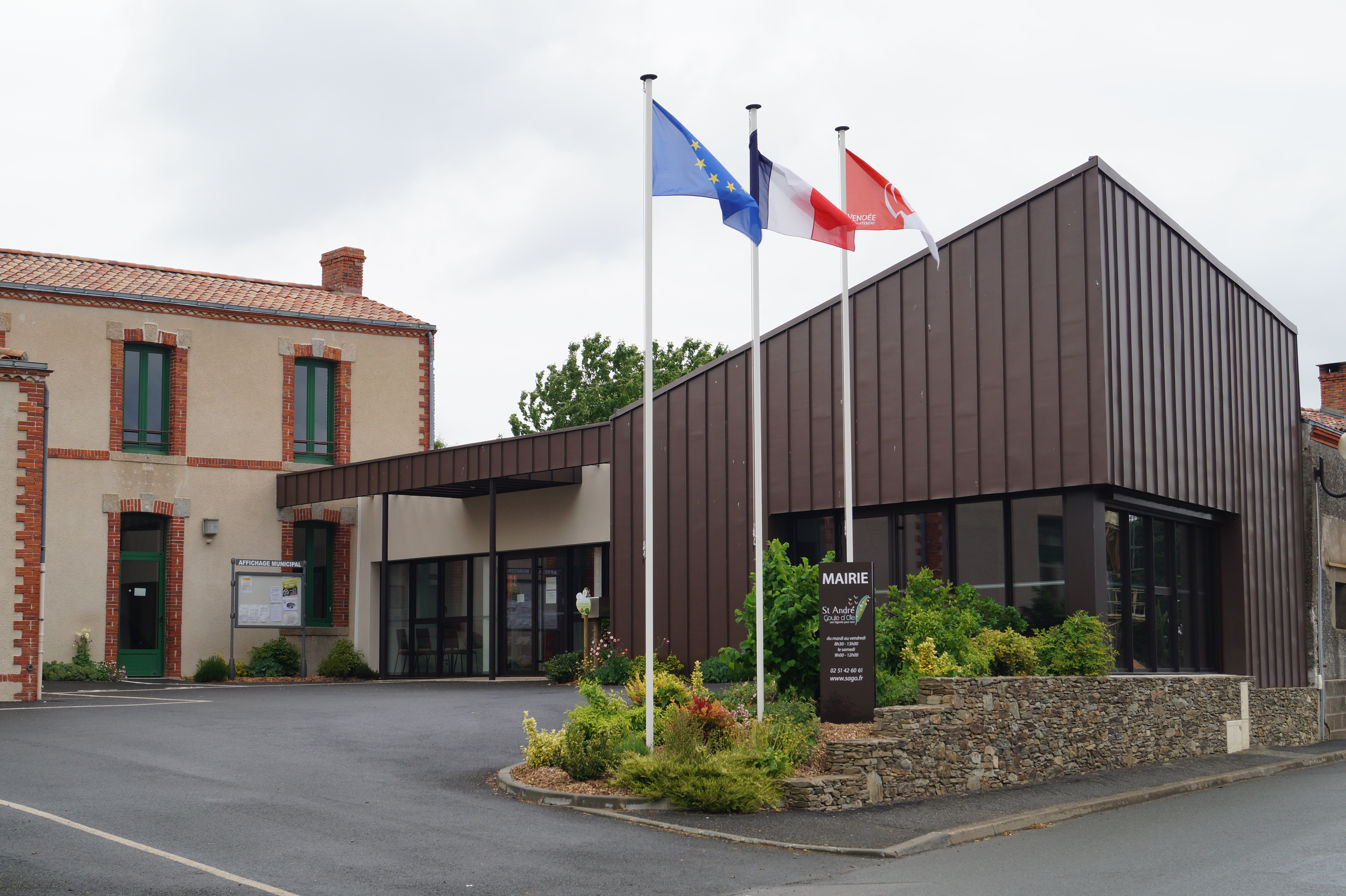
- Town hall of Saint-André-Goule-d'Oie

- Coat of arms
- Location of Saint-André-Goule-d'Oie
- Location within France Location within Pays de la Loire
- Coordinates: 46°50′09″N 1°11′27″W
- Country: France
- Region: Pays de la Loire
- Department: Vendée
- Arrondissement: La Roche-sur-Yon
- Canton: Montaigu-Vendée
- Intercommunality: Pays de Saint-Fulgent - Les Essarts

Government
  - Mayor (2020–2026): Jacky Dallet
- Area^{1}: 20.19 km^{2} (7.80 sq mi)
- Highest elevation: 107 m (351 ft)
- Lowest elevation: 42 m (138 ft)
- Population (2023): 1,960
  - Density: 97.1/km^{2} (251/sq mi)
- Time zone: UTC+01:00 (CET)
  - Summer (DST): UTC+02:00 (CEST)
- INSEE/Postal code: 85196 /85250
- ^{1} French Land Register data, which excludes lakes, ponds, glaciers > 1 km^{2} (0.386 sq mi or 247 acres) and river estuaries.

Saint-André-Goule-d'Oie (French pronunciation: [sɛ̃.t‿ɑ̃dʁe ɡul dwa]) is a commune in the Vendée department in the Pays de la Loire region in western France.

== See also ==
- Communes of the Vendée department
