= Les Brouzils =

- Commune
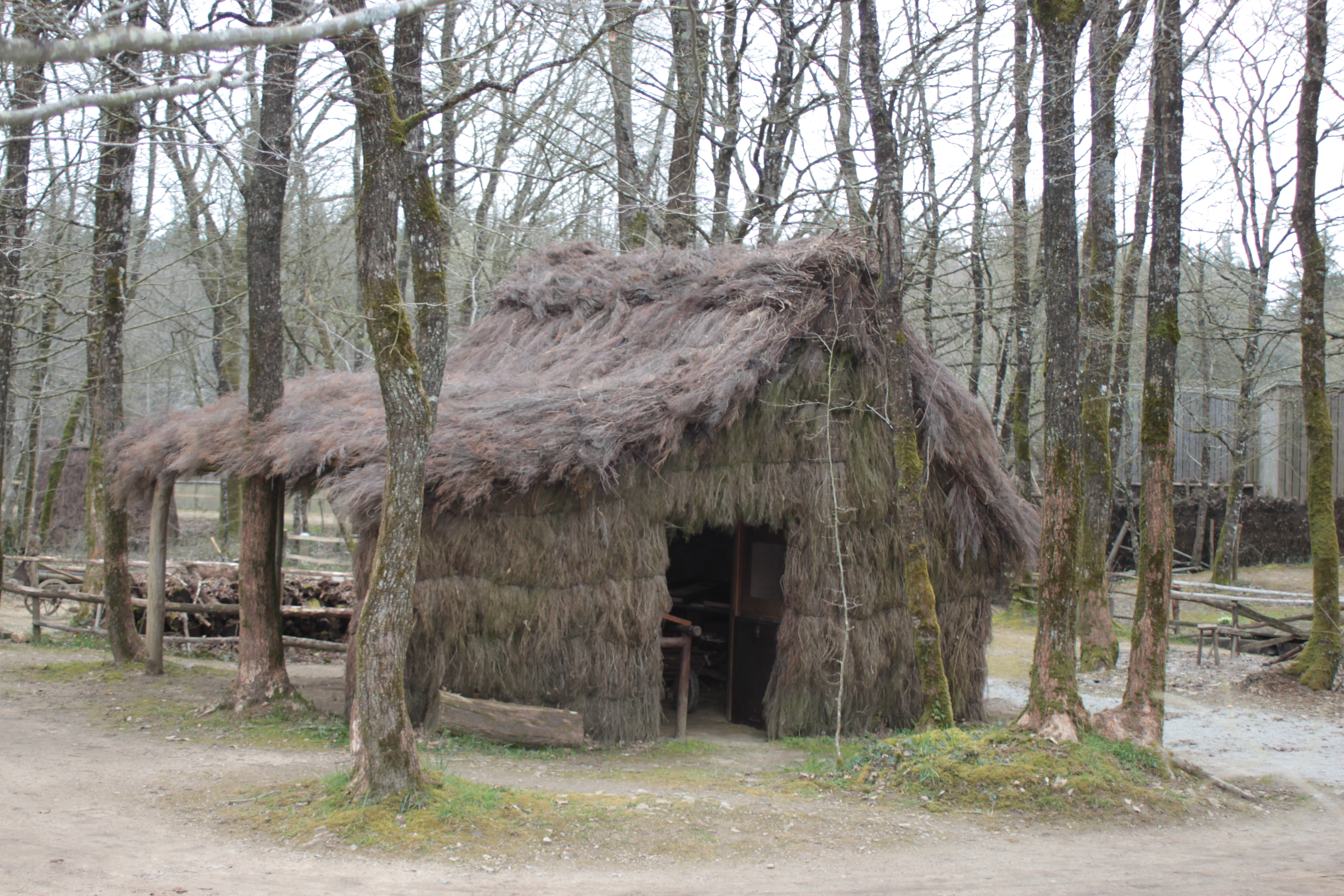
- A reconstructed refuge hut in the forest of Grasla

- Coat of arms
- Location of Les Brouzils
- Location within France Location within Pays de la Loire
- Coordinates: 46°53′16″N 1°19′14″W
- Country: France
- Region: Pays de la Loire
- Department: Vendée
- Arrondissement: La Roche-sur-Yon
- Canton: Montaigu-Vendée
- Intercommunality: Pays de Saint-Fulgent - Les Essarts

Government
  - Mayor (2020–2026): Émilie Duprey
- Area^{1}: 41.25 km^{2} (15.93 sq mi)
- Highest elevation: 78 m (256 ft)
- Lowest elevation: 37 m (121 ft)
- Population (2023): 2,938
  - Density: 71.22/km^{2} (184.5/sq mi)
- Time zone: UTC+01:00 (CET)
  - Summer (DST): UTC+02:00 (CEST)
- INSEE/Postal code: 85038 /85260
- ^{1} French Land Register data, which excludes lakes, ponds, glaciers > 1 km^{2} (0.386 sq mi or 247 acres) and river estuaries.

Les Brouzils (French pronunciation: [le bʁuzil]) is a commune in the Vendée department in the Pays de la Loire region in western France. Its coat of arms has a wolf, which symbolizes bravery.

== Population ==
Historical population
Year	Pop.	±% p.a.
1968	1,931	—
1975	1,886	−0.34%
1982	1,845	−0.31%
1990	1,951	+0.70%
1999	2,031	+0.45%
2007	2,455	+2.40%
2012	2,666	+1.66%
2017	2,799	+0.98%
2023	2,938	+0.81%
Source: INSEE

== See also ==
- Communes of the Vendée department
