= Saint-Philbert-de-Bouaine =

- Commune
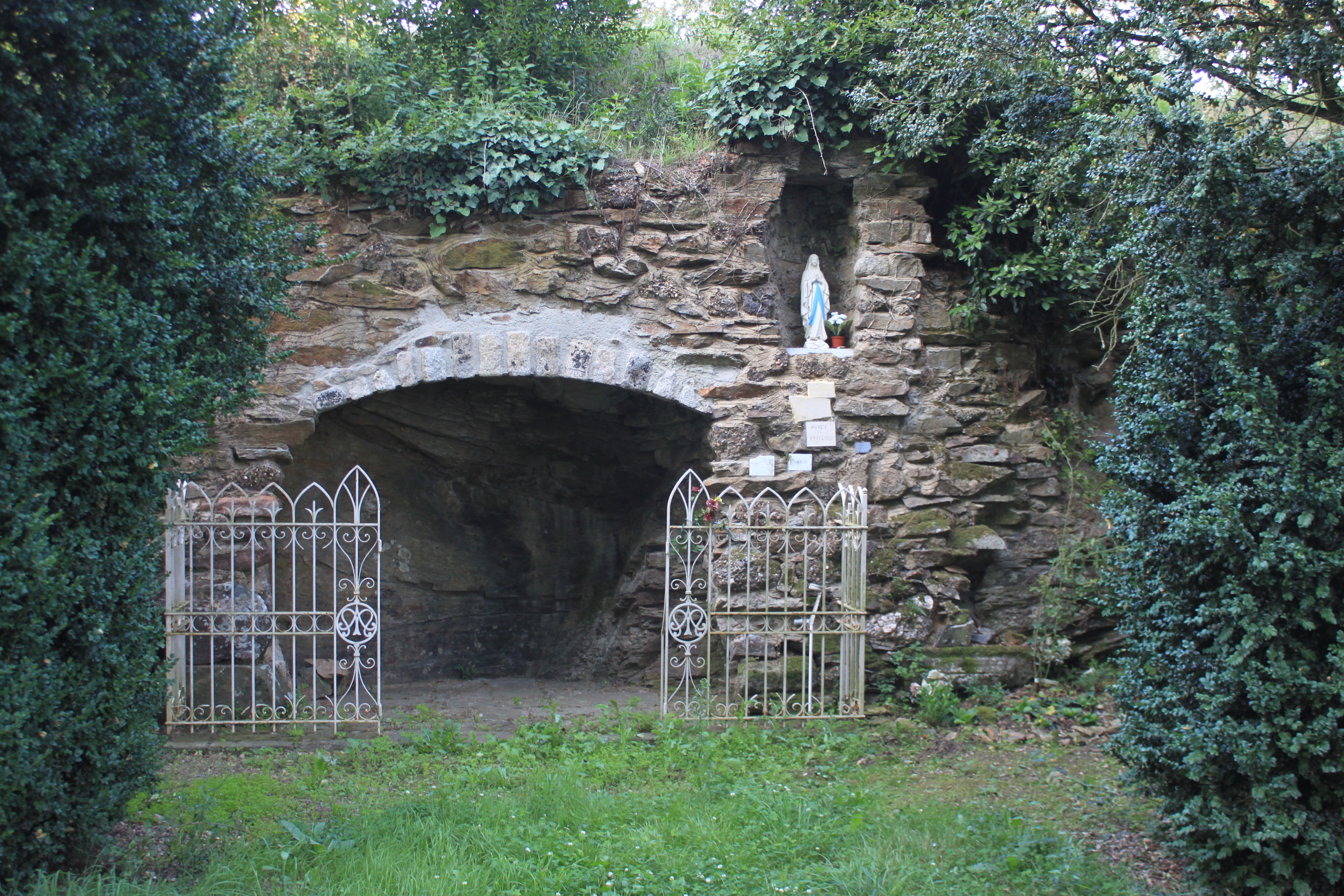
- A replica of the grotto of Lourdes

- Coat of arms
- Location of Saint-Philbert-de-Bouaine
- Location within France Location within Pays de la Loire
- Coordinates: 46°59′10″N 1°31′10″W
- Country: France
- Region: Pays de la Loire
- Department: Vendée
- Arrondissement: La Roche-sur-Yon
- Canton: Aizenay
- Intercommunality: CA Terres de Montaigu

Government
  - Mayor (2020–2026): Francis Breton
- Area^{1}: 50.16 km^{2} (19.37 sq mi)
- Highest elevation: 55 m (180 ft)
- Lowest elevation: 7 m (23 ft)
- Population (2023): 3,653
  - Density: 72.83/km^{2} (188.6/sq mi)
- Time zone: UTC+01:00 (CET)
  - Summer (DST): UTC+02:00 (CEST)
- INSEE/Postal code: 85262 /85660
- ^{1} French Land Register data, which excludes lakes, ponds, glaciers > 1 km^{2} (0.386 sq mi or 247 acres) and river estuaries.

Saint-Philbert-de-Bouaine (French pronunciation: [sɛ̃ filbɛʁ də bwɛn]) is a commune in the Vendée department in the Pays de la Loire region in western France.

== Population ==
Historical population
Year	Pop.	±% p.a.
1968	1,810	—
1975	1,918	+0.83%
1982	2,032	+0.83%
1990	2,105	+0.44%
1999	2,255	+0.77%
2007	2,598	+1.79%
2012	3,145	+3.90%
2017	3,424	+1.71%
2023	3,653	+1.08%
Source: INSEE

== See also ==
- Communes of the Vendée department
