= Rives de l'Yon =

- Commune
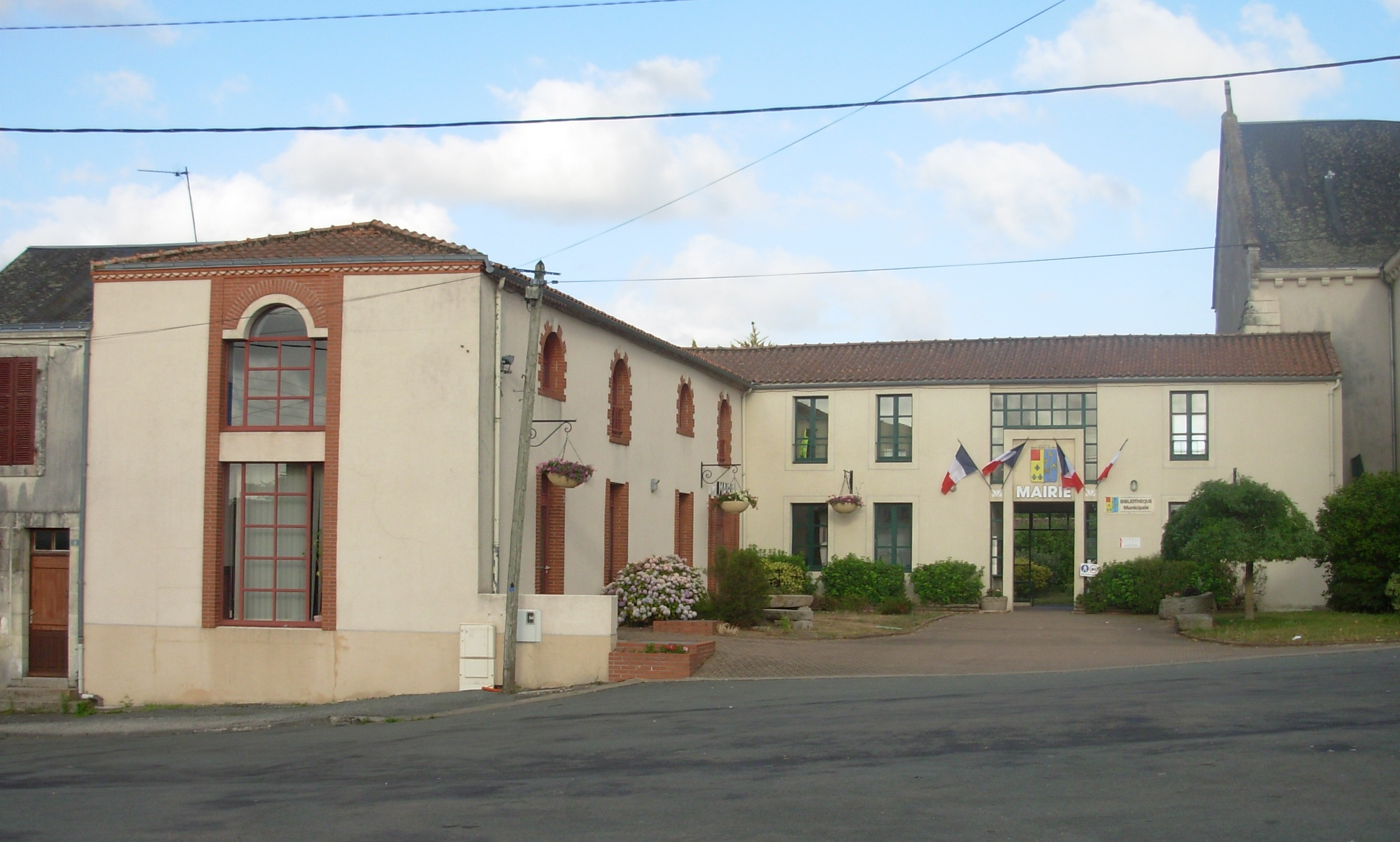
- Rives de l'Yon Town hall
- Location of Rives de l'Yon
- Location within France Location within Pays de la Loire
- Coordinates: 46°35′35″N 1°19′01″W
- Country: France
- Region: Pays de la Loire
- Department: Vendée
- Arrondissement: La Roche-sur-Yon
- Canton: Mareuil-sur-Lay-Dissais
- Intercommunality: La Roche-sur-Yon Agglomération
- Area^{1}: 54.26 km^{2} (20.95 sq mi)
- Population (2023): 4,335
  - Density: 79.89/km^{2} (206.9/sq mi)
- Time zone: UTC+01:00 (CET)
  - Summer (DST): UTC+02:00 (CEST)
- INSEE/Postal code: 85213 /85310
- ^{1} French Land Register data, which excludes lakes, ponds, glaciers > 1 km^{2} (0.386 sq mi or 247 acres) and river estuaries.

Rives de l'Yon (French pronunciation: [ʁiv də ljɔ̃], literally Banks of the Yon) is a commune in the department of Vendée, western France. The municipality was established on 1 January 2016 by merger of the former communes of Saint-Florent-des-Bois and Chaillé-sous-les-Ormeaux.

== Population ==
Population data refer to the area corresponding with the commune as of January 2025.

Historical population
Year	Pop.	±% p.a.
1968	2,399	—
1975	2,488	+0.52%
1982	2,892	+2.17%
1990	3,258	+1.50%
1999	3,382	+0.42%
2007	3,723	+1.21%
2012	3,951	+1.20%
2017	4,160	+1.04%
2023	4,335	+0.69%
Source: INSEE

== See also ==
- Communes of the Vendée department
