= Treize-Septiers =

- Commune
- Coat of arms
- Location of Treize-Septiers
- Location within France Location within Pays de la Loire
- Coordinates: 46°59′07″N 1°13′45″W
- Country: France
- Region: Pays de la Loire
- Department: Vendée
- Arrondissement: La Roche-sur-Yon
- Canton: Montaigu-Vendée
- Intercommunality: CA Terres de Montaigu

Government
  - Mayor (2020–2026): Isabelle Rivière
- Area^{1}: 21.84 km^{2} (8.43 sq mi)
- Highest elevation: 89 m (292 ft)
- Lowest elevation: 48 m (157 ft)
- Population (2023): 3,416
  - Density: 156.4/km^{2} (405.1/sq mi)
- Time zone: UTC+01:00 (CET)
  - Summer (DST): UTC+02:00 (CEST)
- INSEE/Postal code: 85295 /85600
- ^{1} French Land Register data, which excludes lakes, ponds, glaciers > 1 km^{2} (0.386 sq mi or 247 acres) and river estuaries.

Treize-Septiers (French pronunciation: [tʁɛz sɛptje]) is a commune in the Vendée department in the Pays de la Loire region in western France.

== Population ==
Historical population
Year	Pop.	±% p.a.
1968	1,367	—
1975	1,551	+1.82%
1982	1,907	+3.00%
1990	2,126	+1.37%
1999	2,372	+1.22%
2007	2,695	+1.61%
2012	3,010	+2.24%
2017	3,209	+1.29%
2023	3,416	+1.05%
Source: INSEE

== See also ==
- Communes of the Vendée department
