= Canton of Chantonnay =

Coordinates: 46.69°N 1.05°W

The canton of Chantonnay is an administrative division of the Vendée department, western France. Its borders were modified at the French canton reorganisation which came into effect in March 2015. Its seat is in Chantonnay.

It consists of the following communes:

1. Le Boupère
2. Bournezeau
3. Chantonnay
4. Essarts-en-Bocage
5. La Ferrière
6. Fougeré
7. La Merlatière
8. L'Oie
9. Rochetrejoux
10. Sainte-Cécile
11. Sainte-Florence
12. Saint-Germain-de-Prinçay
13. Saint-Hilaire-le-Vouhis
14. Saint-Martin-des-Noyers
15. Saint-Prouant
16. Saint-Vincent-Sterlanges
17. Sigournais
18. Thorigny
