= Canton of Montaigu-Vendée =

Coordinates: 46.98°N 1.31°W

The canton of Montaigu-Vendée (before 2021: Montaigu) is an administrative division of the Vendée department, western France. Its borders were modified at the French canton reorganisation which came into effect in March 2015. Its seat is in Montaigu-Vendée.

It consists of the following communes:

1. Bazoges-en-Paillers
2. La Boissière-de-Montaigu
3. Les Brouzils
4. Chauché
5. Chavagnes-en-Paillers
6. La Copechagnière
7. Mesnard-la-Barotière
8. Montaigu-Vendée
9. La Rabatelière
10. Saint-André-Goule-d'Oie
11. Saint-Fulgent
12. Treize-Septiers
13. Vendrennes
