= La Bruffière =

- Commune
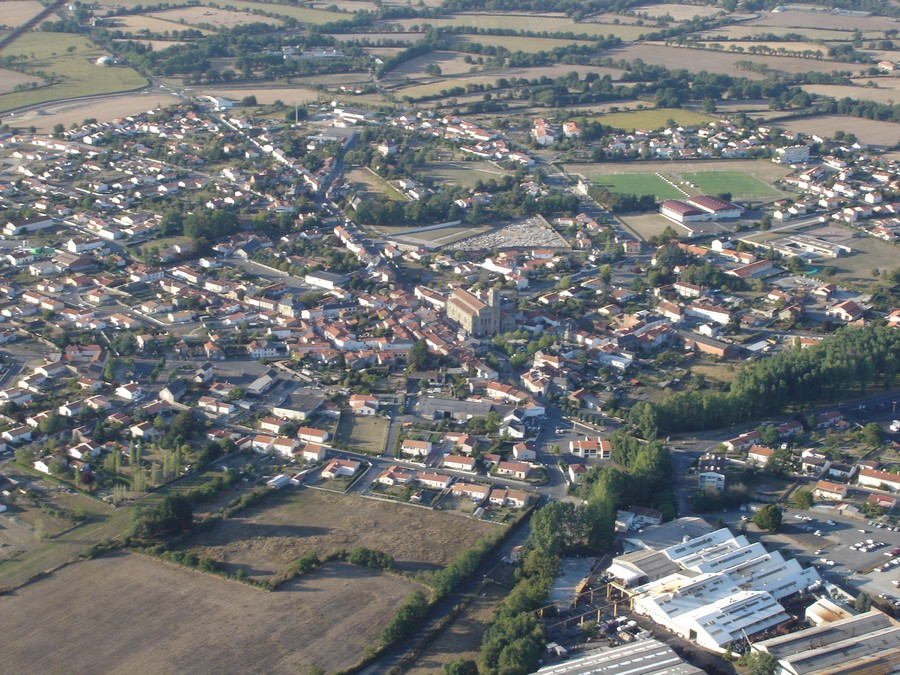
- An aerial view of La Bruffière

- Coat of arms
- Location of La Bruffière
- Location within France Location within Pays de la Loire
- Coordinates: 47°00′50″N 1°11′47″W
- Country: France
- Region: Pays de la Loire
- Department: Vendée
- Arrondissement: La Roche-sur-Yon
- Canton: Mortagne-sur-Sèvre
- Intercommunality: CA Terres de Montaigu

Government
  - Mayor (2020–2026): Jean-Michel Bregeon
- Area^{1}: 40.42 km^{2} (15.61 sq mi)
- Highest elevation: 103 m (338 ft)
- Lowest elevation: 28 m (92 ft)
- Population (2023): 3,987
  - Density: 98.64/km^{2} (255.5/sq mi)
- Time zone: UTC+01:00 (CET)
  - Summer (DST): UTC+02:00 (CEST)
- INSEE/Postal code: 85039 /85530
- ^{1} French Land Register data, which excludes lakes, ponds, glaciers > 1 km^{2} (0.386 sq mi or 247 acres) and river estuaries.

La Bruffière (French pronunciation: [la bʁyfjɛʁ]) is a commune in the Vendée department in the Pays de la Loire region in western France.

== Population ==
Historical population
| Year | Pop. | ±% p.a. |
|---|---|---|
| 1968 | 2,759 | — |
| 1975 | 2,974 | +1.08% |
| 1982 | 2,986 | +0.06% |
| 1990 | 2,980 | −0.03% |
| 1999 | 3,101 | +0.44% |
| 2007 | 3,378 | +1.08% |
| 2012 | 3,794 | +2.35% |
| 2017 | 3,943 | +0.77% |
| 2023 | 3,987 | +0.19% |
Source: INSEE

== See also ==
- Communes of the Vendée department
