= Arrondissement of La Roche-sur-Yon =

Coordinates: 46.67°N 1.43°W

La Roche-sur-Yon
- Arrondissement
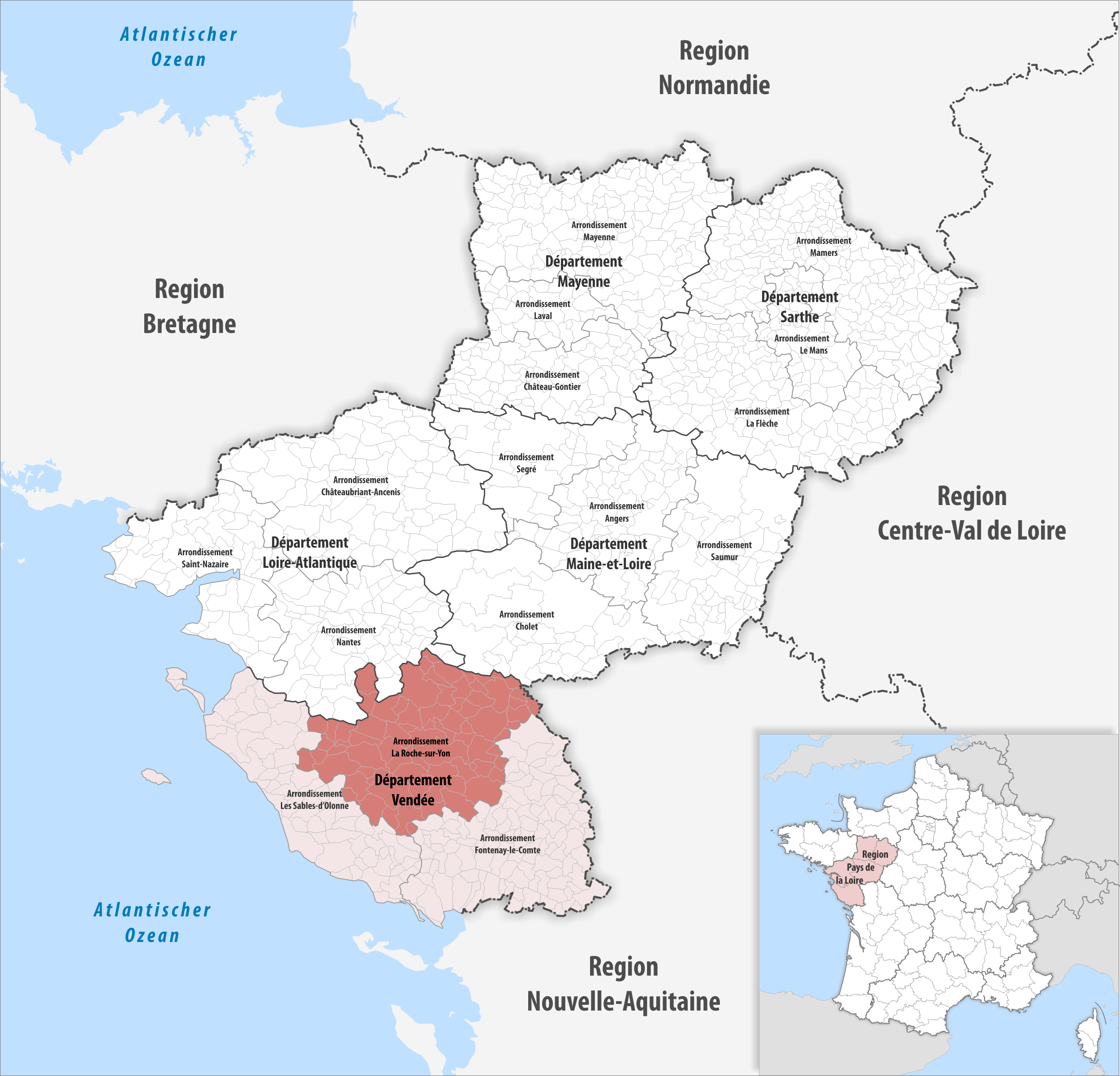
- Location within the region Pays de la Loire
- Country: France
- Region: Pays de la Loire
- Department: Vendée
- No. of communes: {{{nbcomm}}}
- Area: 2,489.1 km^{2} (961.0 sq mi)
- Population (2023): 308,745
  - Density: 124.04/km^{2} (321.26/sq mi)
- INSEE code: 852

The arrondissement of La Roche-sur-Yon is an arrondissement of France in the Vendée department in the Pays de la Loire region. It has 78 communes. Its population is 304,663 (2021), and its area is 2,489.1 km^{2} (961.0 sq mi).

== Composition ==
The communes of the arrondissement of La Roche-sur-Yon, and their INSEE codes, are:

1. Aizenay (85003)
2. Apremont (85006)
3. Aubigny-Les Clouzeaux (85008)
4. Bazoges-en-Paillers (85013)
5. Beaufou (85015)
6. Beaurepaire (85017)
7. Bellevigny (85019)
8. La Boissière-de-Montaigu (85025)
9. Bournezeau (85034)
10. Les Brouzils (85038)
11. La Bruffière (85039)
12. La Chaize-le-Vicomte (85046)
13. Chantonnay (85051)
14. Chanverrie (85302)
15. La Chapelle-Palluau (85055)
16. Chauché (85064)
17. Chavagnes-en-Paillers (85065)
18. La Copechagnière (85072)
19. Cugand-la-Bernardière (85076)
20. Dompierre-sur-Yon (85081)
21. Les Epesses (85082)
22. Essarts-en-Bocage (85084)
23. Falleron (85086)
24. La Ferrière (85089)
25. Fougeré (85093)
26. La Gaubretière (85097)
27. La Genétouze (85098)
28. Grand'Landes (85102)
29. L'Herbergement (85108)
30. Les Herbiers (85109)
31. Landeronde (85118)
32. Les Landes-Genusson (85119)
33. Les Lucs-sur-Boulogne (85129)
34. Maché (85130)
35. Mallièvre (85134)
36. La Merlatière (85142)
37. Mesnard-la-Barotière (85144)
38. Montaigu-Vendée (85146)
39. Montréverd (85197)
40. Mortagne-sur-Sèvre (85151)
41. Mouchamps (85153)
42. Mouilleron-le-Captif (85155)
43. Nesmy (85160)
44. L'Oie (85165)
45. Palluau (85169)
46. Le Poiré-sur-Vie (85178)
47. La Rabatelière (85186)
48. Rives de l'Yon (85213)
49. Rocheservière (85190)
50. La Roche-sur-Yon (85191)
51. Rochetrejoux (85192)
52. Saint-André-Goule-d'Oie (85196)
53. Saint-Aubin-des-Ormeaux (85198)
54. Saint-Denis-la-Chevasse (85208)
55. Sainte-Cécile (85202)
56. Sainte-Florence (85212)
57. Saint-Étienne-du-Bois (85210)
58. Saint-Fulgent (85215)
59. Saint-Germain-de-Prinçay (85220)
60. Saint-Hilaire-le-Vouhis (85232)
61. Saint-Laurent-sur-Sèvre (85238)
62. Saint-Malô-du-Bois (85240)
63. Saint-Mars-la-Réorthe (85242)
64. Saint-Martin-des-Noyers (85246)
65. Saint-Martin-des-Tilleuls (85247)
66. Saint-Paul-en-Pareds (85259)
67. Saint-Paul-Mont-Penit (85260)
68. Saint-Philbert-de-Bouaine (85262)
69. Saint-Prouant (85266)
70. Saint-Vincent-Sterlanges (85276)
71. Sigournais (85282)
72. Le Tablier (85285)
73. Thorigny (85291)
74. Tiffauges (85293)
75. Treize-Septiers (85295)
76. Treize-Vents (85296)
77. Venansault (85300)
78. Vendrennes (85301)

== History ==
The arrondissement of La Roche-sur-Yon was created in 1804. At the January 2017 reorganisation of the arrondissements of Vendée, it received eight communes from the arrondissement of Les Sables-d'Olonne, and it lost 11 communes to the arrondissement of Fontenay-le-Comte. In January 2019 the commune Landeronde passed from the arrondissement of Les Sables-d'Olonne to the arrondissement of La Roche-sur-Yon.

As a result of the reorganisation of the cantons of France which came into effect in 2015, the borders of the cantons are no longer related to the borders of the arrondissements. The cantons of the arrondissement of La Roche-sur-Yon were, as of January 2015:

1. Chantonnay
2. Les Essarts
3. Les Herbiers
4. Mareuil-sur-Lay-Dissais
5. Montaigu
6. Mortagne-sur-Sèvre
7. Le Poiré-sur-Vie
8. Rocheservière
9. La Roche-sur-Yon-Nord
10. La Roche-sur-Yon-Sud
11. Saint-Fulgent
