= Aubigny =

Aubigny may refer to:

== Places in Australia ==
- Aubigny, North Quay, a historic house in Brisbane, Queensland, Australia
- Aubigny, Queensland, a town in Toowoomba Region, Queensland, Australia
- County of Aubigny, a county in Queensland, Australia
- Electoral district of Aubigny, an electoral district in Queensland, Australia

== Places in Canada ==
- Aubigny, Manitoba, a small community in the province of Manitoba

== Places in France ==
- Aubigny, Allier, a commune
- Aubigny, Calvados, a commune
- Aubigny, Deux-Sèvres, a commune
- Aubigny, Moselle, a former seigneurie and commune
  - Château d'Aubigny
- Aubigny, Somme, a commune
- Aubigny, Vendée, a former commune

== See also ==
- Duke of Aubigny
- Aubigny-au-Bac, Nord
- Aubigny-aux-Kaisnes, Aisne
- Aubigny-en-Artois, Pas-de-Calais
- Aubigny-en-Laonnois, Aisne
- Aubigny-en-Plaine, Côte-d'Or
- Aubigny-la-Ronce, Côte-d'Or
- Aubigny-les-Pothées, Ardennes
- Aubigny-lès-Sombernon, Côte-d'Or
- Aubigny-sur-Nère, Cher
