= Thorigny =

- Commune
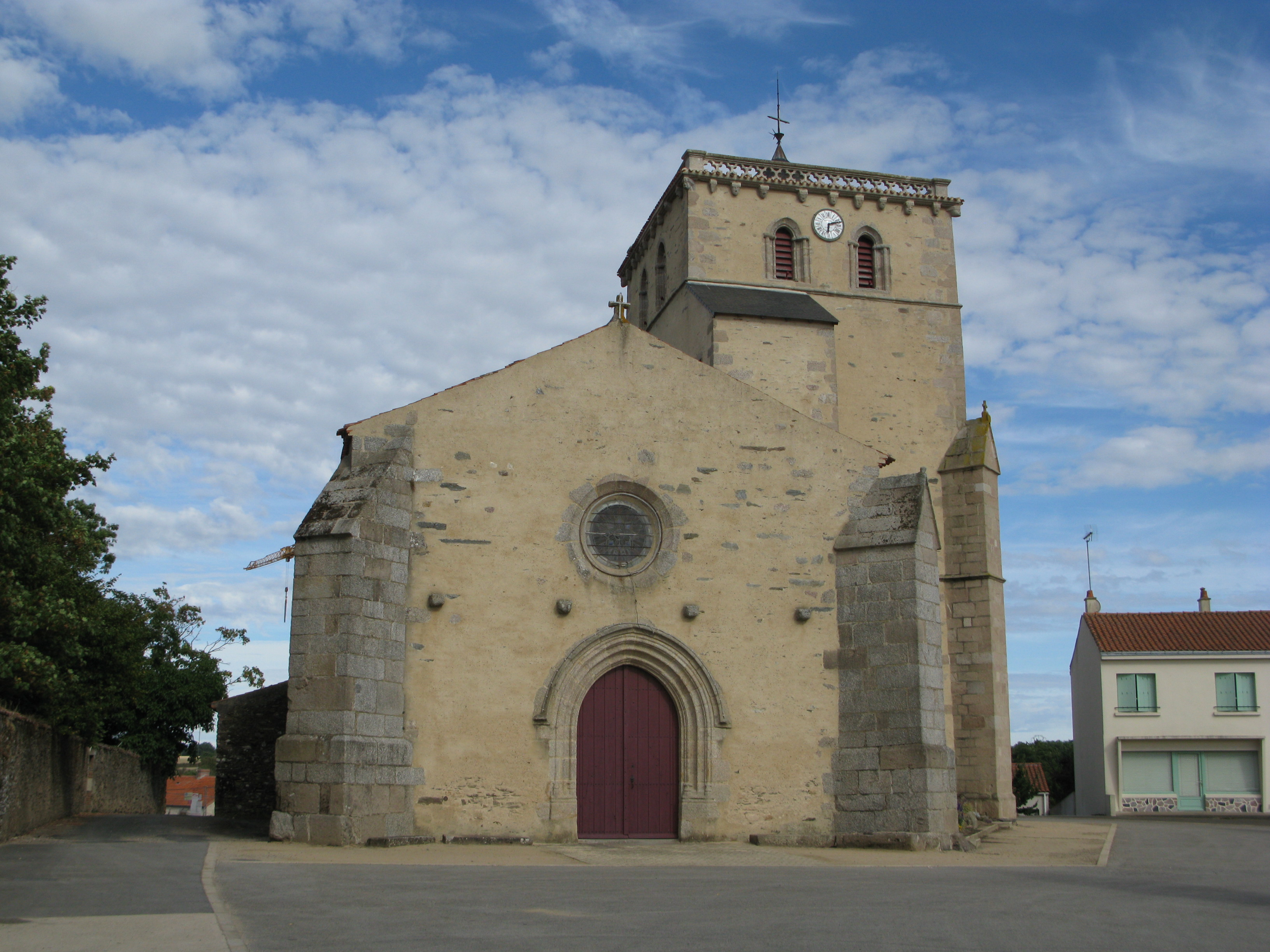
- The church in Thorigny

- Coat of arms
- Location of Thorigny
- Location within France Location within Pays de la Loire
- Coordinates: 46°36′46″N 1°14′19″W
- Country: France
- Region: Pays de la Loire
- Department: Vendée
- Arrondissement: La Roche-sur-Yon
- Canton: Chantonnay
- Intercommunality: La Roche-sur-Yon Agglomération

Government
  - Mayor (2020–2026): Alexandra Gaboriau
- Area^{1}: 32.15 km^{2} (12.41 sq mi)
- Highest elevation: 97 m (318 ft)
- Lowest elevation: 19 m (62 ft)
- Population (2023): 1,275
  - Density: 39.66/km^{2} (102.7/sq mi)
- Time zone: UTC+01:00 (CET)
  - Summer (DST): UTC+02:00 (CEST)
- INSEE/Postal code: 85291 /85480
- ^{1} French Land Register data, which excludes lakes, ponds, glaciers > 1 km^{2} (0.386 sq mi or 247 acres) and river estuaries.

Thorigny (French pronunciation: [tɔʁiɲi]) is a commune in the Vendée department in the Pays de la Loire region in western France.

== Education ==
The commune has a public elementary school, École publique Jacques Golly de Thorigny, and private school, Ecole Privée Jeanne D'Arc

Collège public Jean RENOIR, a public junior high school in La Roche Sur-Yon, serves the commune.

Nearby private schools include Ecole Privée Saint Joseph in Fougeré and Collège privé RICHELIEU in La Roche Sur-Yon.

There is also a public library in Thorigny.

== See also ==
- Communes of the Vendée department
