= Les Clouzeaux =

Commune in Vendèe, France

- Part of Aubigny-Les Clouzeaux
- Coat of arms
- Location of Les Clouzeaux
- Location within France Location within Pays de la Loire
- Coordinates: 46°37′51″N 1°30′27″W
- Country: France
- Region: Pays de la Loire
- Department: Vendée
- Arrondissement: La Roche-sur-Yon
- Canton: La Roche-sur-Yon-2
- Commune: Aubigny-Les Clouzeaux
- Area^{1}: 26.49 km^{2} (10.23 sq mi)
- Highest elevation: 77 m (253 ft)
- Lowest elevation: 37 m (121 ft)
- Population (2022): 3,196
  - Density: 120.6/km^{2} (312.5/sq mi)
- Time zone: UTC+01:00 (CET)
  - Summer (DST): UTC+02:00 (CEST)
- Postal code: 85430
- ^{1} French Land Register data, which excludes lakes, ponds, glaciers > 1 km^{2} (0.386 sq mi or 247 acres) and river estuaries.

Les Clouzeaux (French pronunciation: [le kluzo]) is a former commune of the Vendée department in the Pays de la Loire region in western France. On 1 January 2016, it was merged into the new commune of Aubigny-Les Clouzeaux. Its male inhabitants are called Cluzéliens, and Cluzéliennes for the female ones.

== See also ==
- Communes of the Vendée department
