= Gilbert Prouteau =

French poet

Olympic medal record

Art competitions
Bronze medal – third place	1948 London	Lyric works

Gilbert Prouteau (14 June 1917 – 2 August 2012) was a French poet and film director. He was born in Nesmy, Vendée. In 1948 he won a bronze medal in the art competitions of the Olympic Games for his "Rythme du Stade" ("Rhythm of the Stadium"). At the beginning of the 1990s he was, with Jean-Pierre Thiollet, one of the writers contributing to the French magazine L'Amateur d'Art.

== Selected works ==
- Rythme du Stade, Lugdunum, 1942 (poems)
- La part du vent, Ariane, 1947 (poems)
- Anthologie des textes sportifs de la littérature, Défense de la France, 1948
- Saison blanche, Amiot Dumont, 1951
- Le Sexe des Anges, Grasset, 1952
- La peur des femmes, Grasset, 1959
- Immortelle Vendée, Les productions de Paris, 1959
- Retour aux sources, Editions Hérault, 1960
- Les Dieux meurent le matin, Grasset, 1962 (A collection relating the tragic deaths of ten poets).
- Le machin, La Table Ronde, 1965
- Tout est dans la fin, Robert Laffont, 1971
- Comme un vol de corbeaux, La Table Ronde, 1977
- Le Dernier Défi de Georges Clemenceau, France Empire, 1979
- Le grand roman de Jules Verne: sa vie, Stock, 1979
- Sept morts d'amour, Hachette, 1981
- Les miroirs de la perversité, Albin Michel, 1984
- La Nuit de l'île d'Aix ou le Crépuscule d'un dieu, Albin Michel, 1985
- Gilles de Rais ou la Gueule du loup, Editions du Rocher, 1992
- La bataille de Cholet ou la guerre en sabots, Editions du Rocher, 1993
- Le fabuleux secret de l'alchimiste : Nicolas Flamel prophète ou imposteur, Bartillat, 1994
- Je te dis qu’il faut vivre, Editions Hérault, 1998
- Monsieur l'instituteur, Albin Michel, 2000
- Victor Hugo vendéen, Mosée, 2002
- Les Soleils de minuit, Editions Hérault, 2003
- Rabelais en Vendée, D'Orbestier, 2004
- Les Orgues d’Hélène, Écho Optique, 2007 (poems)
- Le Roman de la Vendée, Geste, 2010
- Les mots de passe, Editions du Petit Pavé, 2013

== Filmography ==
- La Vie passionnée de Georges Clemenceau (1953)
- Dieu a choisi Paris (1969), with Jean-Paul Belmondo
