= Venansault =

- Commune
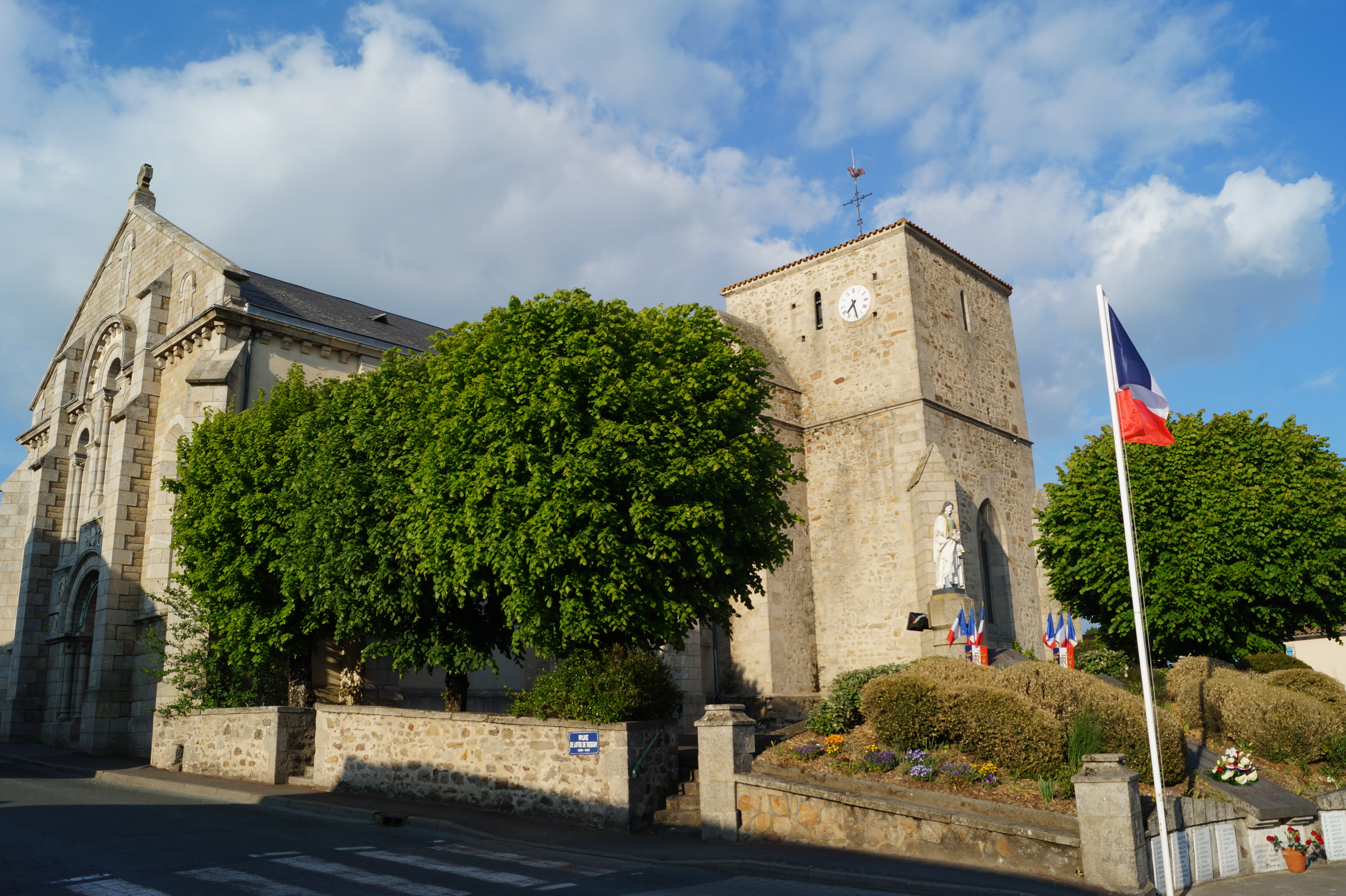
- Location of Venansault
- Location within France Location within Pays de la Loire
- Coordinates: 46°41′13″N 1°30′41″W
- Country: France
- Region: Pays de la Loire
- Department: Vendée
- Arrondissement: La Roche-sur-Yon
- Canton: La Roche-sur-Yon-1
- Intercommunality: La Roche-sur-Yon Agglomération

Government
  - Mayor (2020–2026): Laurent Favreau
- Area^{1}: 44.49 km^{2} (17.18 sq mi)
- Highest elevation: 79 m (259 ft)
- Lowest elevation: 33 m (108 ft)
- Population (2023): 4,757
  - Density: 106.9/km^{2} (276.9/sq mi)
- Time zone: UTC+01:00 (CET)
  - Summer (DST): UTC+02:00 (CEST)
- INSEE/Postal code: 85300 /85190
- ^{1} French Land Register data, which excludes lakes, ponds, glaciers > 1 km^{2} (0.386 sq mi or 247 acres) and river estuaries.

Venansault (French pronunciation: [vənɑ̃so]) is a commune in the northern-western of France. Located in the Vendée department in the Pays de Loire region. It belongs to the urban area and agglomeration of La Roche-sur-Yon (chief town of the department).

== Population ==
Historical population
| Year | Pop. | ±% p.a. |
|---|---|---|
| 1968 | 1,584 | — |
| 1975 | 1,787 | +1.74% |
| 1982 | 2,636 | +5.71% |
| 1990 | 3,163 | +2.30% |
| 1999 | 3,527 | +1.22% |
| 2007 | 4,186 | +2.16% |
| 2012 | 4,580 | +1.82% |
| 2017 | 4,644 | +0.28% |
| 2023 | 4,757 | +0.40% |
Source: INSEE

The French demonym for its inhabitants is Venansaltais (masculine) or Venansaltaise (feminine).

== Toponymy ==
Saint Venant (Saint Venance Fortunat), a man of letters from Italy, 25th bishop of Poitiers, who died at the very beginning of the 6th century, is said to be the origin of the name of the commune. However, it is also possible that it comes from the Latin word "Venantisaltus", meaning "Wooded gorge".

Despite these hypotheses, the radical of the name is rare and unique in the region. Only one commune in France seems to share it : Venanson in the Alpes-Maritimes. There is also commune called Saint-Venant in Pas-de-Calais, and Saint-Venant-de-Paquette in Quebec which are said to have their orignins in a holy hermit named "Venatius" (Venant)

== International relations ==
Created in 1999, the Twinning Committee aims to encourage the establishment of relations between the inhabitants of Venansault and those of the twin towns.This association has already created twinnings with the town of Wolin in Poland and the town of Mercury in France.

== See also ==
- Communes of the Vendée department
