= Landeronde =

- Commune
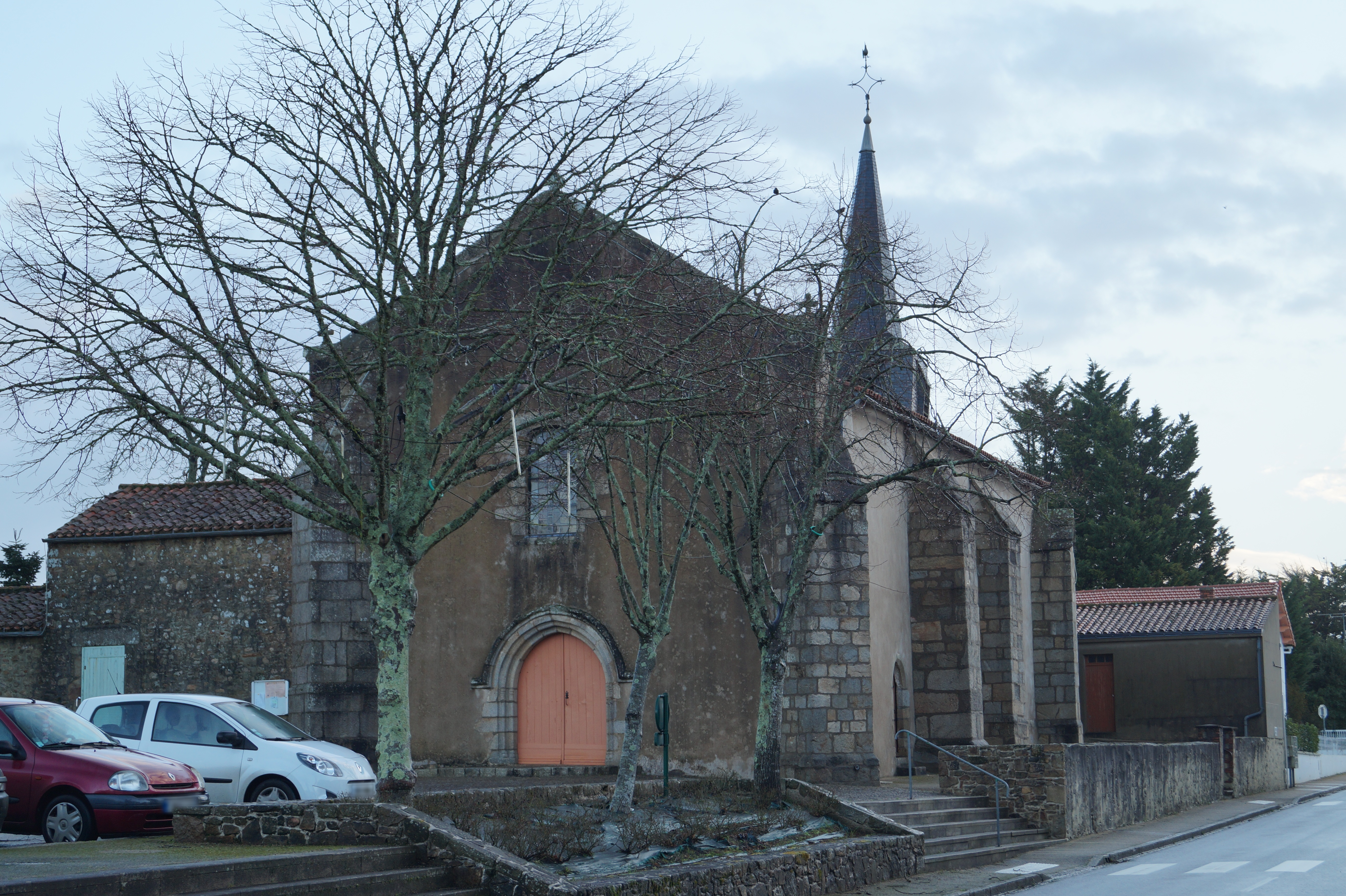

- Coat of arms
- Location of Landeronde
- Location within France Location within Pays de la Loire
- Coordinates: 46°39′32″N 1°34′12″W
- Country: France
- Region: Pays de la Loire
- Department: Vendée
- Arrondissement: La Roche-sur-Yon
- Canton: La Roche-sur-Yon-1
- Intercommunality: La Roche-sur-Yon Agglomération

Government
  - Mayor (2020–2026): Angie Leboeuf
- Area^{1}: 17.96 km^{2} (6.93 sq mi)
- Highest elevation: 72 m (236 ft)
- Lowest elevation: 29 m (95 ft)
- Population (2023): 2,303
  - Density: 128.2/km^{2} (332.1/sq mi)
- Time zone: UTC+01:00 (CET)
  - Summer (DST): UTC+02:00 (CEST)
- INSEE/Postal code: 85118 /85150
- ^{1} French Land Register data, which excludes lakes, ponds, glaciers > 1 km^{2} (0.386 sq mi or 247 acres) and river estuaries.

Landeronde (French pronunciation: [lɑ̃dʁɔ̃d]) is a commune in the Vendée department in the Pays de la Loire region in western France.

== Population ==
Historical population
Year	Pop.	±% p.a.
1968	854	—
1975	822	−0.54%
1982	1,444	+8.38%
1990	1,613	+1.39%
1999	1,817	+1.33%
2007	2,093	+1.78%
2012	2,238	+1.35%
2017	2,279	+0.36%
2023	2,303	+0.17%
Source: INSEE

== See also ==
- Communes of the Vendée department
