= Aubigny-Les Clouzeaux =

- Commune
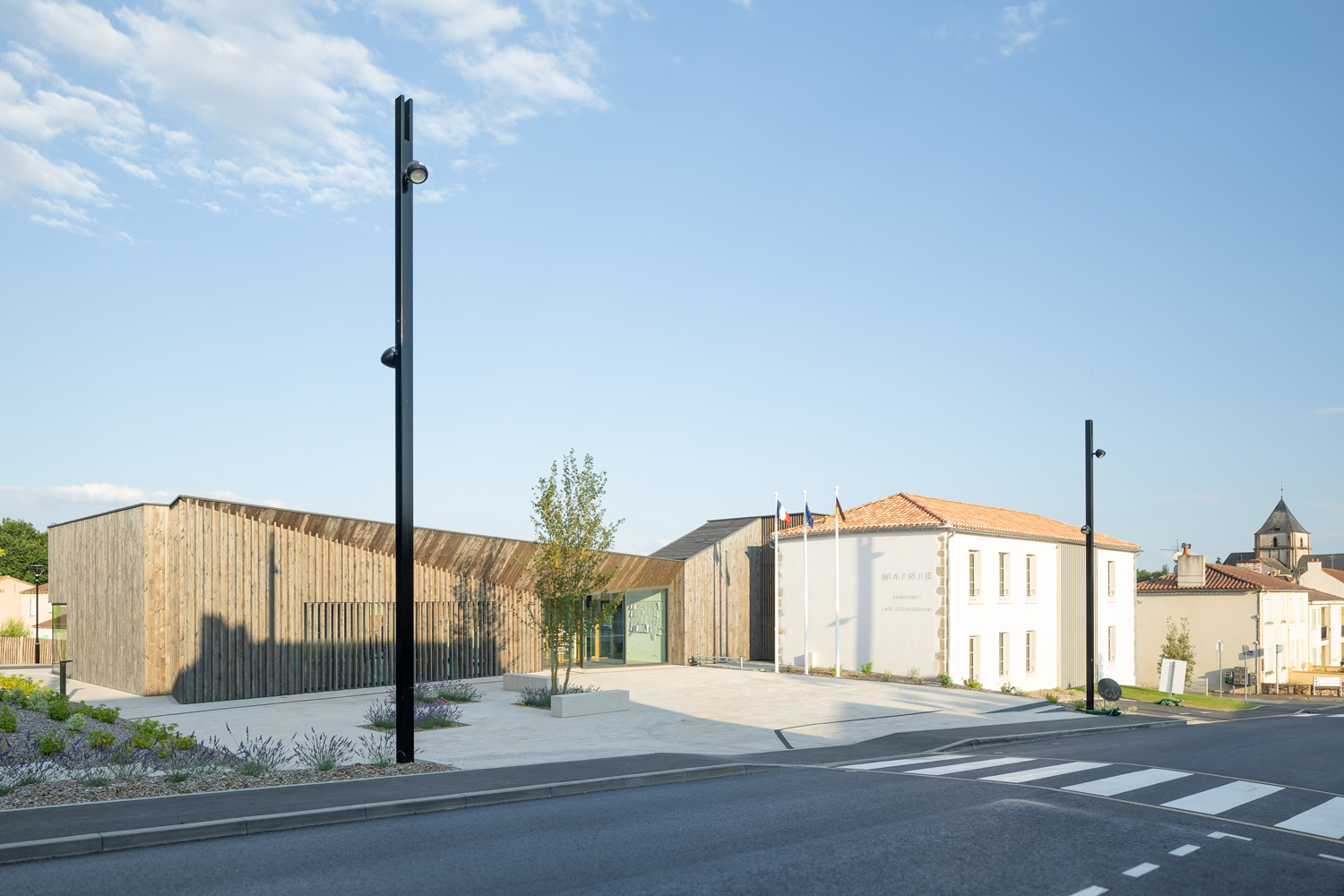
- Town hall of Aubigny-Les Clouzeaux
- Location of Aubigny-Les Clouzeaux
- Location within France Location within Pays de la Loire
- Coordinates: 46°35′49″N 1°27′11″W
- Country: France
- Region: Pays de la Loire
- Department: Vendée
- Arrondissement: La Roche-sur-Yon
- Canton: La Roche-sur-Yon-2
- Intercommunality: La Roche-sur-Yon Agglomération

Government
  - Mayor (2023–2026): Michelle Grellier
- Area^{1}: 52.28 km^{2} (20.19 sq mi)
- Population (2023): 7,191
  - Density: 137.5/km^{2} (356.2/sq mi)
- Time zone: UTC+01:00 (CET)
  - Summer (DST): UTC+02:00 (CEST)
- INSEE/Postal code: 85008 /85430
- ^{1} French Land Register data, which excludes lakes, ponds, glaciers > 1 km^{2} (0.386 sq mi or 247 acres) and river estuaries.

Aubigny-Les Clouzeaux (French pronunciation: [obiɲi le kluzo]) is a commune in the department of Vendée, western France. The municipality was established on 1 January 2016 by merger of the former communes of Aubigny and Les Clouzeaux.

== Population ==
Population data refer to the area corresponding with the commune as of January 2025.

Historical population
Year	Pop.	±% p.a.
1968	2,304	—
1975	3,274	+5.15%
1982	4,041	+3.05%
1990	4,205	+0.50%
1999	4,436	+0.60%
2007	5,239	+2.10%
2012	5,925	+2.49%
2017	6,571	+2.09%
2023	7,191	+1.51%
Source: INSEE

== See also ==
- Communes of the Vendée department
