= Nesmy =

- Commune
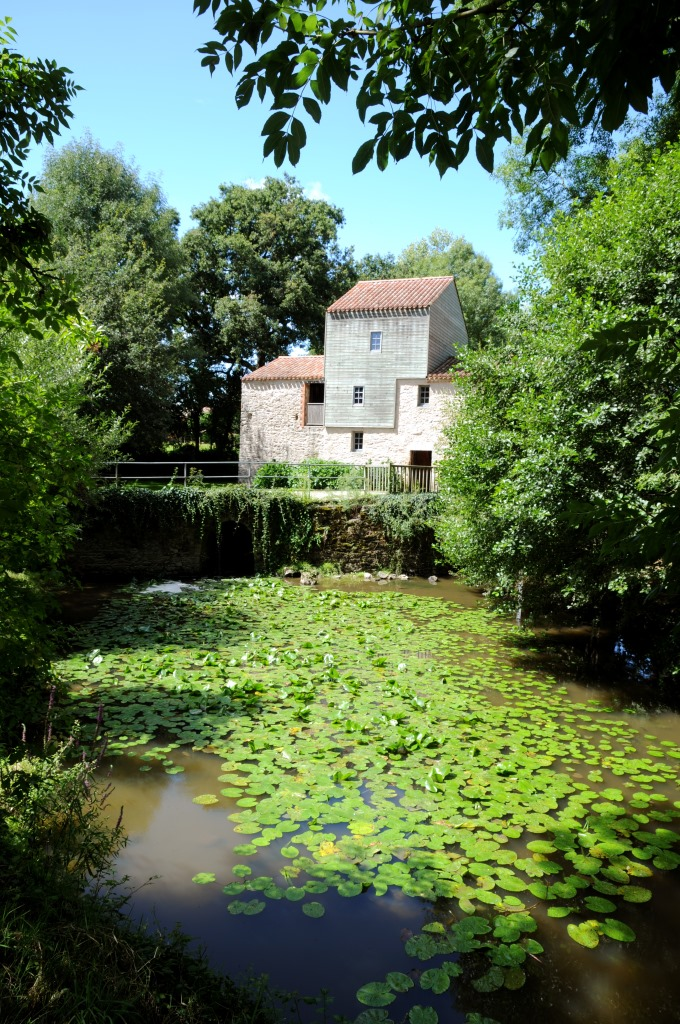
- The Rambourg mill

- Coat of arms
- Location of Nesmy
- Location within France Location within Pays de la Loire
- Coordinates: 46°35′32″N 1°24′09″W
- Country: France
- Region: Pays de la Loire
- Department: Vendée
- Arrondissement: La Roche-sur-Yon
- Canton: La Roche-sur-Yon-2
- Intercommunality: La Roche-sur-Yon Agglomération

Government
  - Mayor (2020–2026): Thierry Ganachaud
- Area^{1}: 25.42 km^{2} (9.81 sq mi)
- Elevation: 45 m (148 ft)
- Highest elevation: 79 m (259 ft)
- Lowest elevation: 32 m (105 ft)
- Population (2023): 3,100
  - Density: 120/km^{2} (320/sq mi)
- Time zone: UTC+01:00 (CET)
  - Summer (DST): UTC+02:00 (CEST)
- INSEE/Postal code: 85160 /85310
- ^{1} French Land Register data, which excludes lakes, ponds, glaciers > 1 km^{2} (0.386 sq mi or 247 acres) and river estuaries.

Nesmy (French pronunciation: [nɛmi]) is a commune in the Vendée department in the Pays de la Loire region in western France. It is located 30 km (19 mi) from the Atlantic Ocean and 10 km (6.2 mi) from La Roche-sur-Yon.

Nesmy is part of the Communauté d'agglomération La Roche-sur-Yon Agglomération (before 2010, it was : the Communauté de Communes du Pays Yonnais).

== Geography ==
The river Yon forms most of the commune's north-eastern border.

== Population ==
Historical population
Year	Pop.	±% p.a.
1968	1,241	—
1975	1,390	+1.63%
1982	1,790	+3.68%
1990	1,963	+1.16%
1999	1,976	+0.07%
2007	2,366	+2.28%
2012	2,744	+3.01%
2017	2,883	+0.99%
2023	3,100	+1.22%
Source: INSEE

== Sights and culture ==
Nesmy is famous for its potteries and tileries, an artisanal tradition.

The area has many hiking trails, points of interest include:

- The Mill of Rambourg, a water mill
- The Yon river
- The Old Pottery of Nesmy
- A private Castle
- La Domangère golf course, internationally famous

== Economy ==
Nesmy houses the Zone of Activities of Le Chaillot, near to the A87 motorway.

== Twin towns ==
Nesmy is twinned with Burggen, in Bavaria, which is close to the Alps in Germany, allowing for regular meetings.

== Personalities ==
- Gilbert Prouteau: writer born in Nesmy
- Henri Laborit: scientist and artist
- Gérard Potier: artist and actor-storyteller

== See also ==
- Communes of the Vendée department
