= La Roche-sur-Yon Agglomération =

- Communauté d'agglomération
- Interactive map of La Roche-sur-Yon Agglomération
- Coordinates: 46°40′N 01°25′W
- Country: France
- Region: Pays de la Loire
- Department: Vendée
- No. of communes: {{{nbcomm}}}
- Established: 2010
- Area: 499.4 km^{2} (192.8 sq mi)
- Population (2019): 97,771
  - Density: 195.8/km^{2} (507.1/sq mi)
- Website: www.larochesuryon.fr

La Roche-sur-Yon Agglomération is the communauté d'agglomération, an intercommunal structure, centred on the city of La Roche-sur-Yon. It is located in the Vendée department, in the Pays de la Loire region, western France. Created in 2010, its seat is in La Roche-sur-Yon. Its area is 499.4 km^{2}. Its population was 97,771 in 2019, of which 55,147 in La Roche-sur-Yon proper.

== Composition ==
The communauté d'agglomération consists of the following 13 communes:

1. Aubigny-Les Clouzeaux
2. La Chaize-le-Vicomte
3. Dompierre-sur-Yon
4. La Ferrière
5. Fougeré
6. Landeronde
7. Mouilleron-le-Captif
8. Nesmy
9. Rives de l'Yon
10. La Roche-sur-Yon
11. Le Tablier
12. Thorigny
13. Venansault
