= Aubigny, Vendée =

Aubigny
- Part of Aubigny-Les Clouzeaux
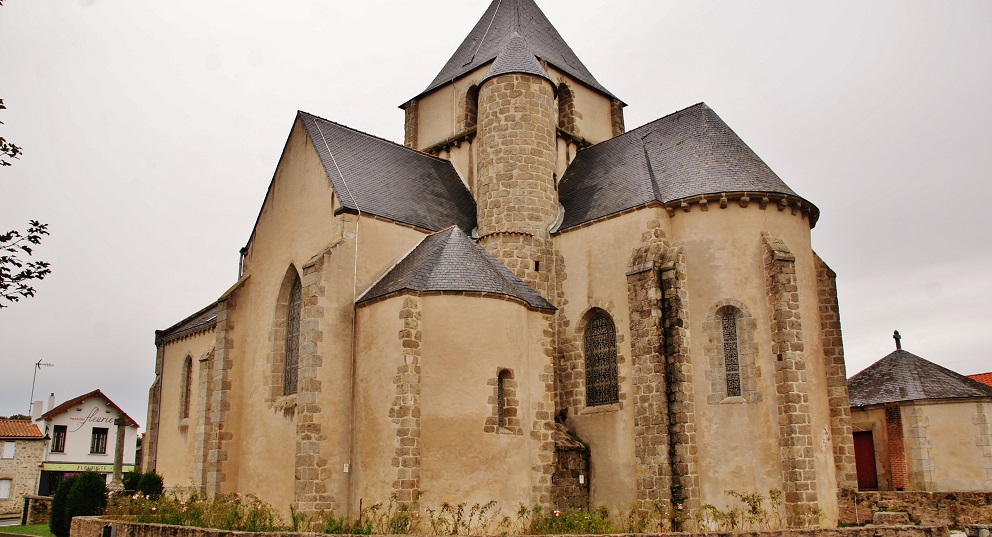
- Église Saint-Laurent d'Aubigny

- Coat of arms
- Location of Aubigny
- Location within France Location within Pays de la Loire
- Coordinates: 46°35′51″N 1°27′09″W
- Country: France
- Region: Pays de la Loire
- Department: Vendée
- Arrondissement: La Roche-sur-Yon
- Canton: La Roche-sur-Yon-2
- Commune: Aubigny-Les Clouzeaux
- Area^{1}: 25.79 km^{2} (9.96 sq mi)
- Elevation: 61 m (200 ft)
- Highest elevation: 77 m (253 ft)
- Lowest elevation: 33 m (108 ft)
- Population (2022): 3,933
  - Density: 152.5/km^{2} (395.0/sq mi)
- Time zone: UTC+01:00 (CET)
  - Summer (DST): UTC+02:00 (CEST)
- Postal code: 85430
- ^{1} French Land Register data, which excludes lakes, ponds, glaciers > 1 km^{2} (0.386 sq mi or 247 acres) and river estuaries.

Aubigny (French pronunciation: [obiɲi]) is a former commune in the Vendée department in the Pays de la Loire region in western France. On 1 January 2016, it was merged into the new commune of Aubigny-Les Clouzeaux.

== See also ==
- Communes of the Vendée department
