= La Ferrière, Vendée =

La Ferrière
- Commune
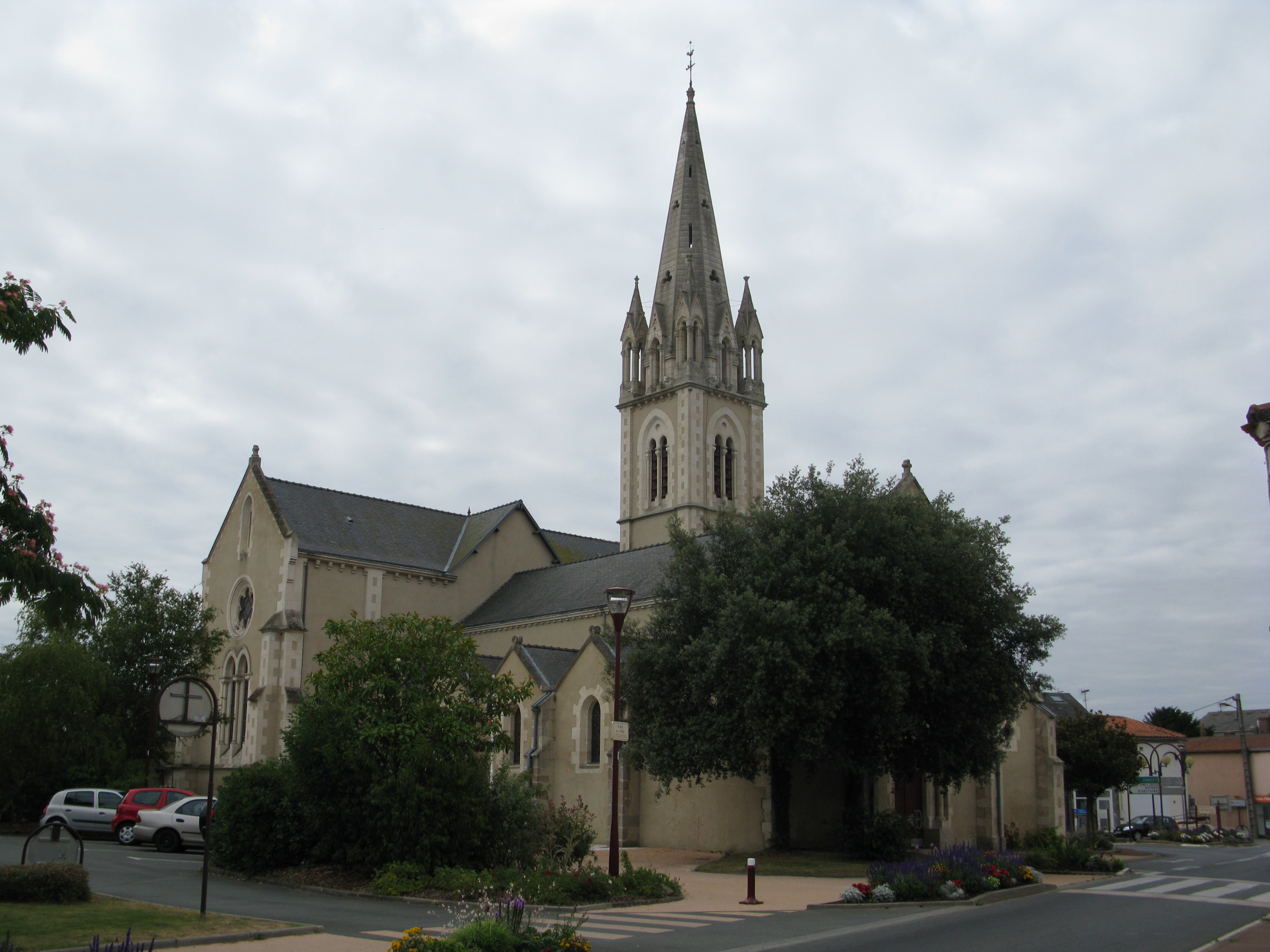
- The church in La Ferrière
- Location of La Ferrière
- Location within France Location within Pays de la Loire
- Coordinates: 46°42′51″N 1°18′48″W
- Country: France
- Region: Pays de la Loire
- Department: Vendée
- Arrondissement: La Roche-sur-Yon
- Canton: Chantonnay
- Intercommunality: La Roche-sur-Yon Agglomération

Government
  - Mayor (2020–2026): David Bély
- Area^{1}: 47.17 km^{2} (18.21 sq mi)
- Highest elevation: 105 m (344 ft)
- Lowest elevation: 55 m (180 ft)
- Population (2023): 5,454
  - Density: 115.6/km^{2} (299.5/sq mi)
- Time zone: UTC+01:00 (CET)
  - Summer (DST): UTC+02:00 (CEST)
- INSEE/Postal code: 85089 /85280
- ^{1} French Land Register data, which excludes lakes, ponds, glaciers > 1 km^{2} (0.386 sq mi or 247 acres) and river estuaries.

La Ferrière (French pronunciation: [la fɛʁjɛʁ]) is a commune in the Vendée department in the Pays de la Loire region in western France.

== Geography ==
The river Yon forms all of the commune's north-western and western borders.

== Population ==
Historical population
Year	Pop.	±% p.a.
1968	2,009	—
1975	2,393	+2.53%
1982	3,361	+4.97%
1990	3,765	+1.43%
1999	3,948	+0.53%
2007	4,466	+1.55%
2012	4,920	+1.96%
2017	5,255	+1.33%
2023	5,454	+0.62%
Source: INSEE

== See also ==
- Communes of the Vendée department
