= Aubigny-en-Laonnois =

- Commune
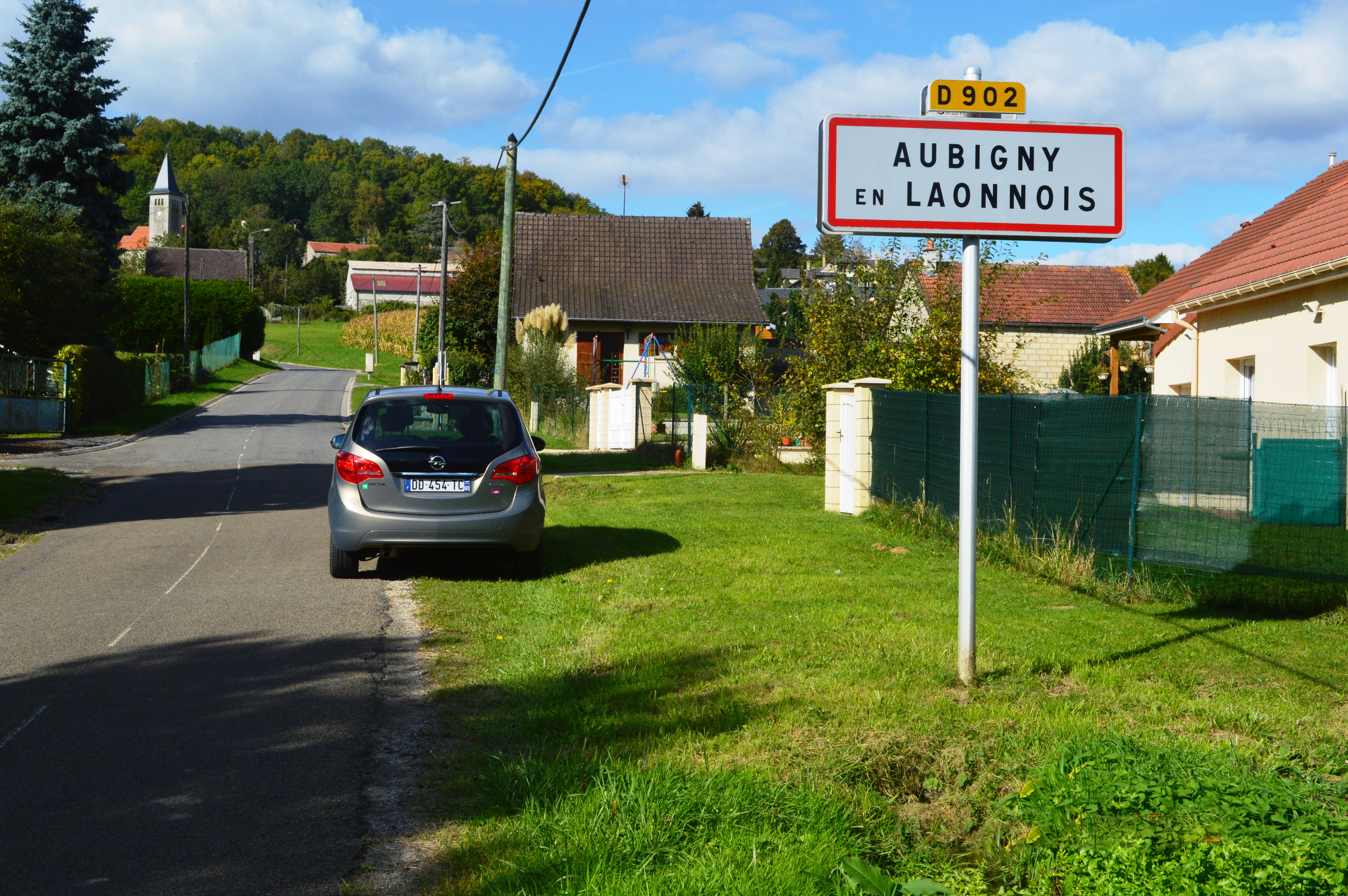
- Location of Aubigny-en-Laonnois
- Location within France Location within Hauts-de-France
- Coordinates: 49°29′56″N 3°47′31″E
- Country: France
- Region: Hauts-de-France
- Department: Aisne
- Arrondissement: Laon
- Canton: Villeneuve-sur-Aisne
- Intercommunality: Chemin des Dames

Government
  - Mayor (2026–32): Gérard Tutin
- Area^{1}: 4.41 km^{2} (1.70 sq mi)
- Highest elevation: 212 m (696 ft)
- Lowest elevation: 92 m (302 ft)
- Population (2023): 102
  - Density: 23.1/km^{2} (59.9/sq mi)
- Time zone: UTC+01:00 (CET)
  - Summer (DST): UTC+02:00 (CEST)
- INSEE/Postal code: 02033 /02820
- ^{1} French Land Register data, which excludes lakes, ponds, glaciers > 1 km^{2} (0.386 sq mi or 247 acres) and river estuaries.

Aubigny-en-Laonnois is a commune in the department of Aisne in the Hauts-de-France region of northern France.

== Geography ==
Aubigny-en-Laonnois is located some 18 km south-east of Laon and 35 km north-west of Rheims. It can be accessed by main highway D1044 which runs along and forms most of the western border of the commune. Access to the village is by the D907 road from Courtrizy-et-Fussigny in the north, changing to the D902 at the commune border and continuing south to the village and south again through the commune to join the D1044. The D90 also runs east from the D1044 forming part of the northern border of the commune and continuing to Saint-Erme-Outre-et-Ramecourt. The D88 also runs west from the D1044 through the south of the commune and continuing to Aizelles. The commune consists of mixed farmland and forests with no other villages or hamlets.

The Ruisseau de Fayau rises in the commune and flows south-east to join the Mielle river east of Corbeny.

=== Neighbouring communes and villages ===
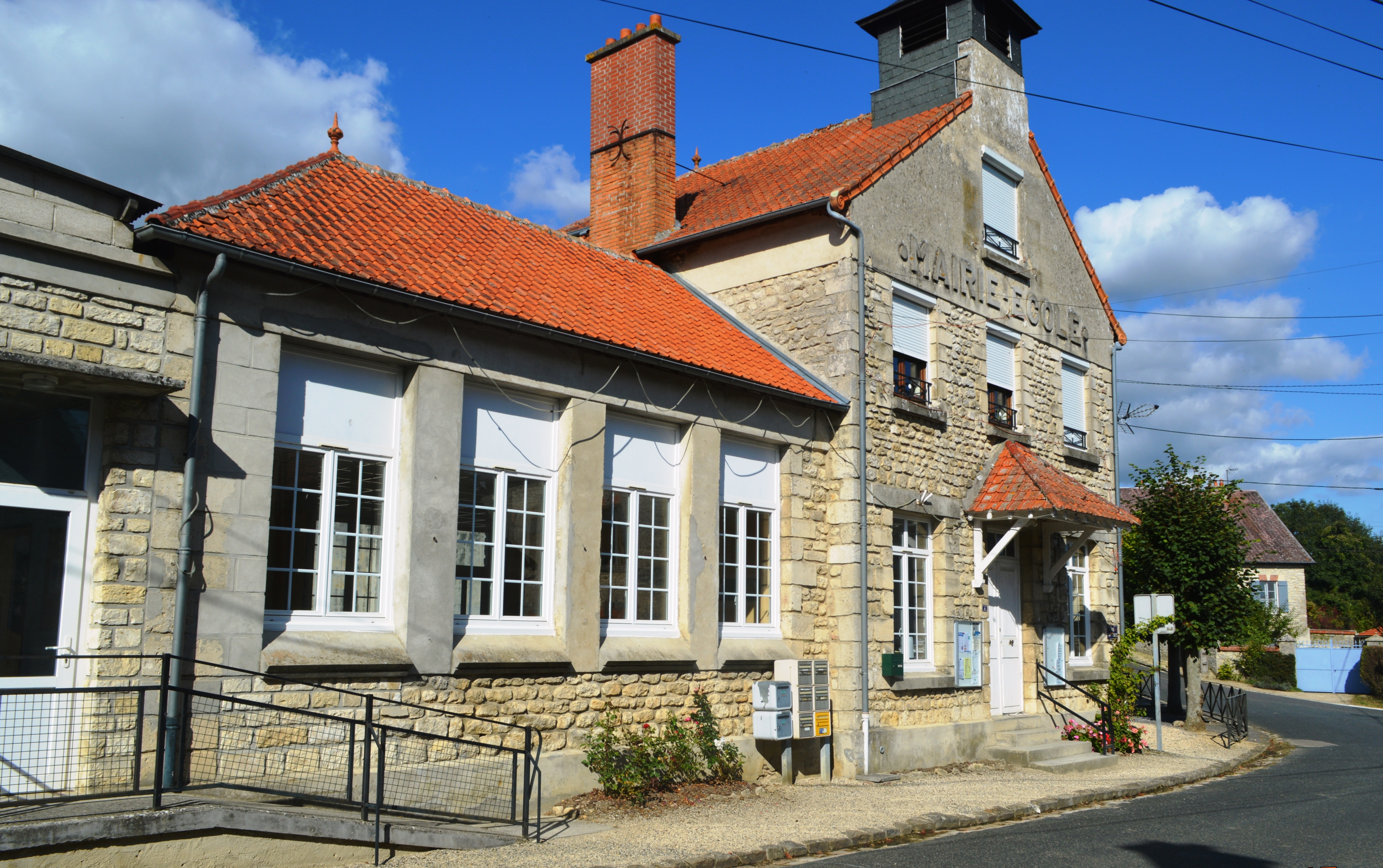
The Town Hall

== Population ==
Historical population
Year	Pop.	±% p.a.
1968	124	—
1975	85	−5.25%
1982	94	+1.45%
1990	120	+3.10%
1999	114	−0.57%
2007	116	+0.22%
2012	111	−0.88%
2017	105	−1.11%
2023	102	−0.48%
Source: INSEE

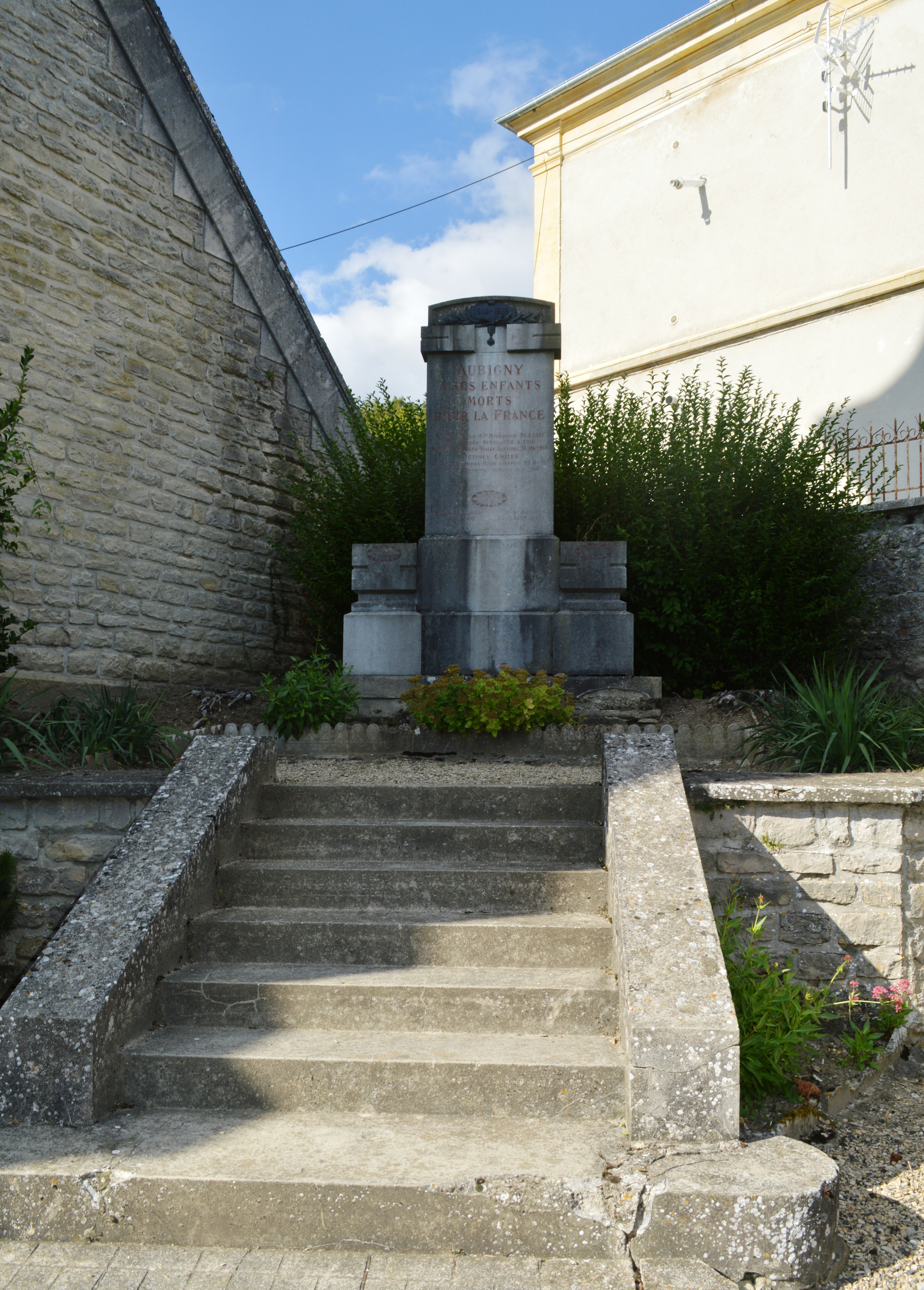
Aubigny-en-Laonnois War Memorial

== Economy ==
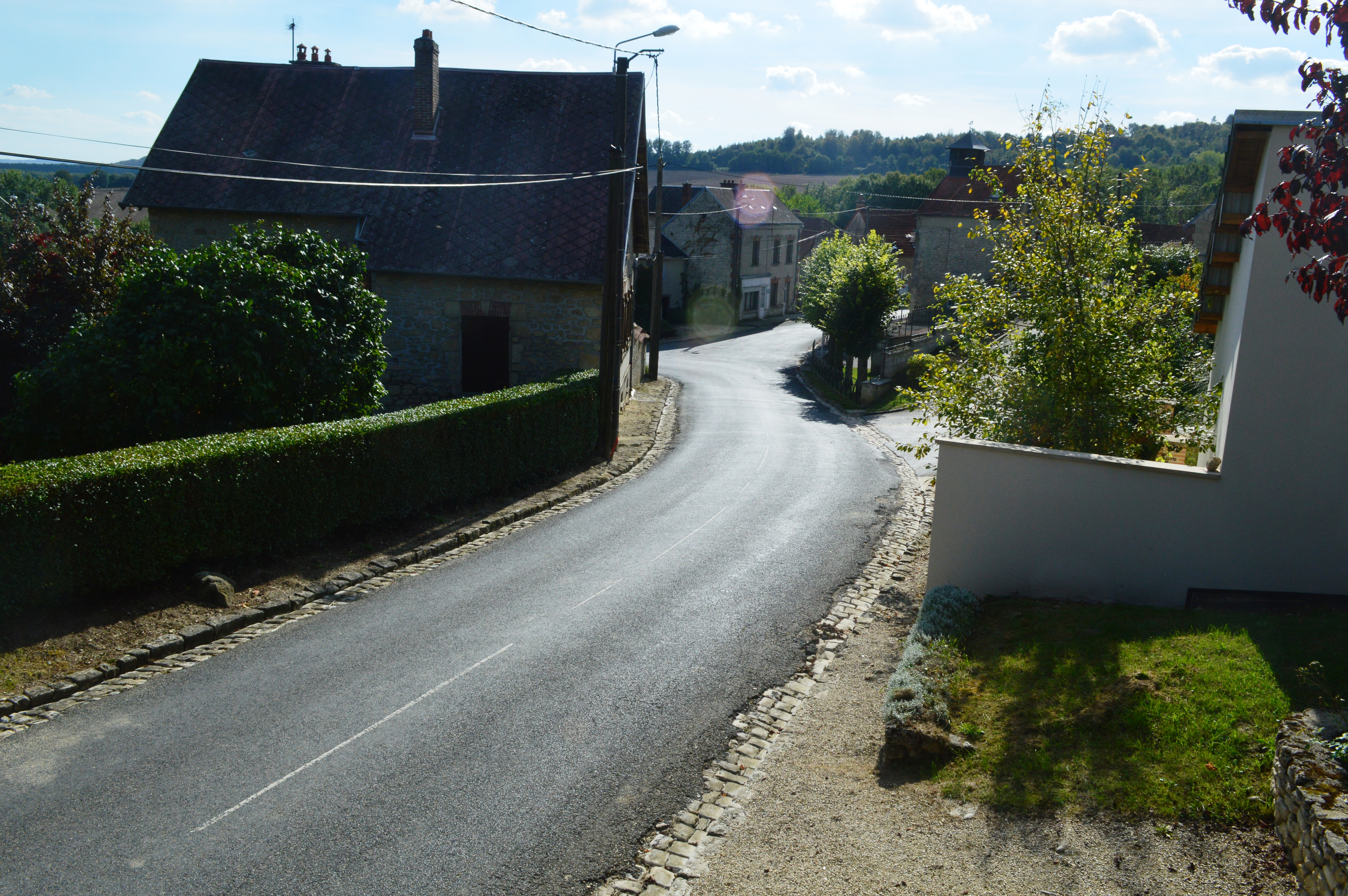
A street in Aubigny-en-Laonnois

=== Agriculture ===
The rolling hills of Aubigny are particularly conducive to the cultivation of strawberries. Strawberries are planted in late summer: August and September. In February, they are mulched and tarpaulined to protect them from spring frosts. Harvest begins in late April or, at the latest, mid-May if it is a very cold year. Strawberries are harvested by hand and placed in 500 g or 250 g trays then sold in the markets of Laon, Saint-Quentin, Charleville-Mézières, and Epernay. In recent years, varieties have multiplied: Gariguette, Ciflorette, Mara des bois, Darselect, and finally the famous forest strawberry (in order of seasonal arrival).

== Culture and heritage ==
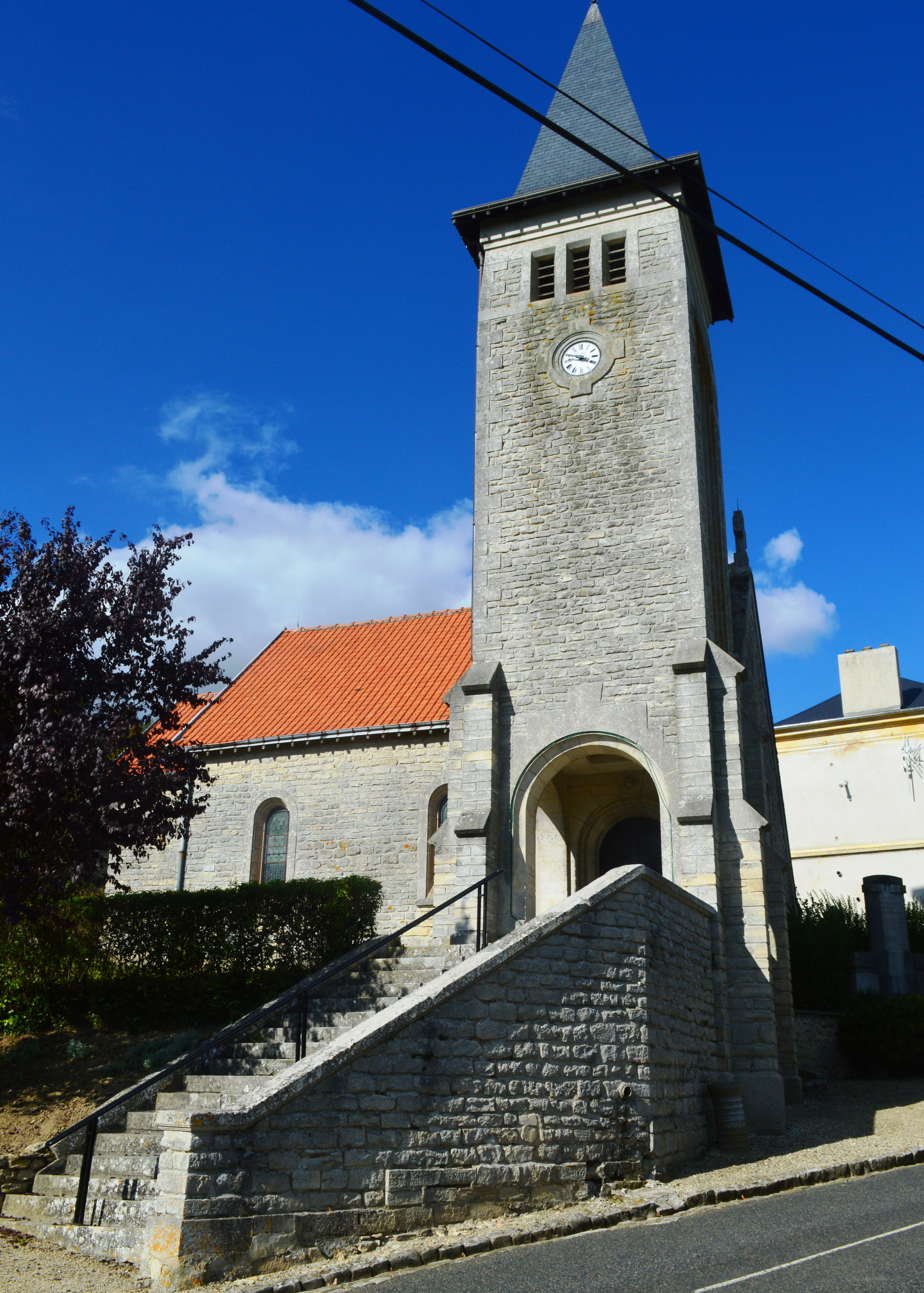
Aubigny-en-Laonnois Church

=== Civil heritage ===
The Chateau Park is registered as an historical monument.

== See also ==
- Communes of the Aisne department
