= Fougeré, Vendée =

Fougeré
- Commune
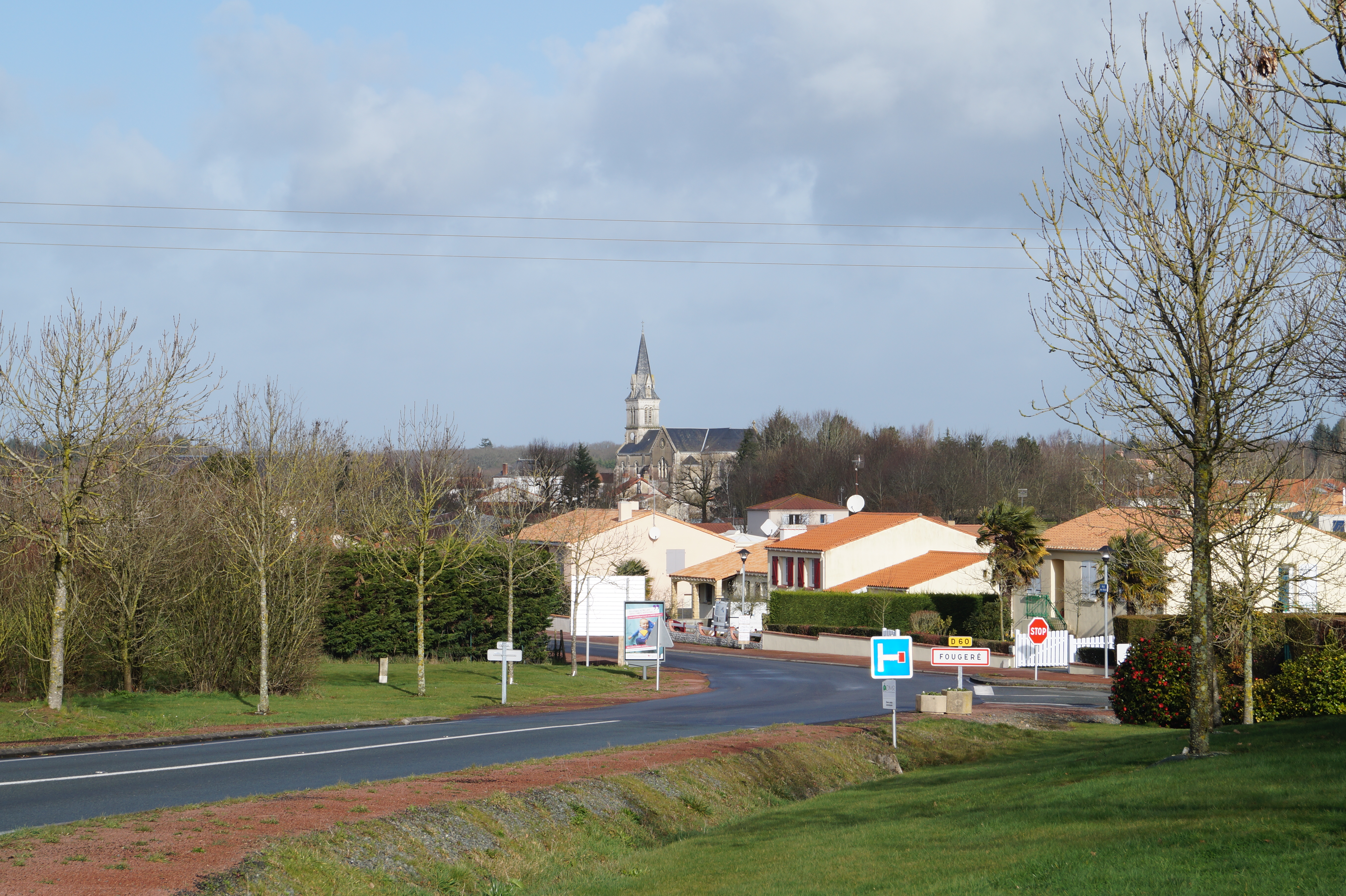
- Location of Fougeré
- Location within France Location within Pays de la Loire
- Coordinates: 46°39′33″N 1°13′52″W
- Country: France
- Region: Pays de la Loire
- Department: Vendée
- Arrondissement: La Roche-sur-Yon
- Canton: Chantonnay
- Intercommunality: La Roche-sur-Yon Agglomération

Government
  - Mayor (2020–2026): Manuel Guibert
- Area^{1}: 26.89 km^{2} (10.38 sq mi)
- Highest elevation: 110 m (360 ft)
- Lowest elevation: 53 m (174 ft)
- Population (2023): 1,240
  - Density: 46.1/km^{2} (119/sq mi)
- Time zone: UTC+01:00 (CET)
  - Summer (DST): UTC+02:00 (CEST)
- INSEE/Postal code: 85093 /85480
- ^{1} French Land Register data, which excludes lakes, ponds, glaciers > 1 km^{2} (0.386 sq mi or 247 acres) and river estuaries.

Fougeré (French pronunciation: [fuʒʁe]) is a commune in the Vendée department in the Pays de la Loire region in western France.

== Education ==
The commune has one public elementary school, Ecole Jacques Prévert, and a private school, Ecole Saint-Joseph.

== See also ==
- Communes of the Vendée department
