= Aubigny-en-Plaine =

- Commune
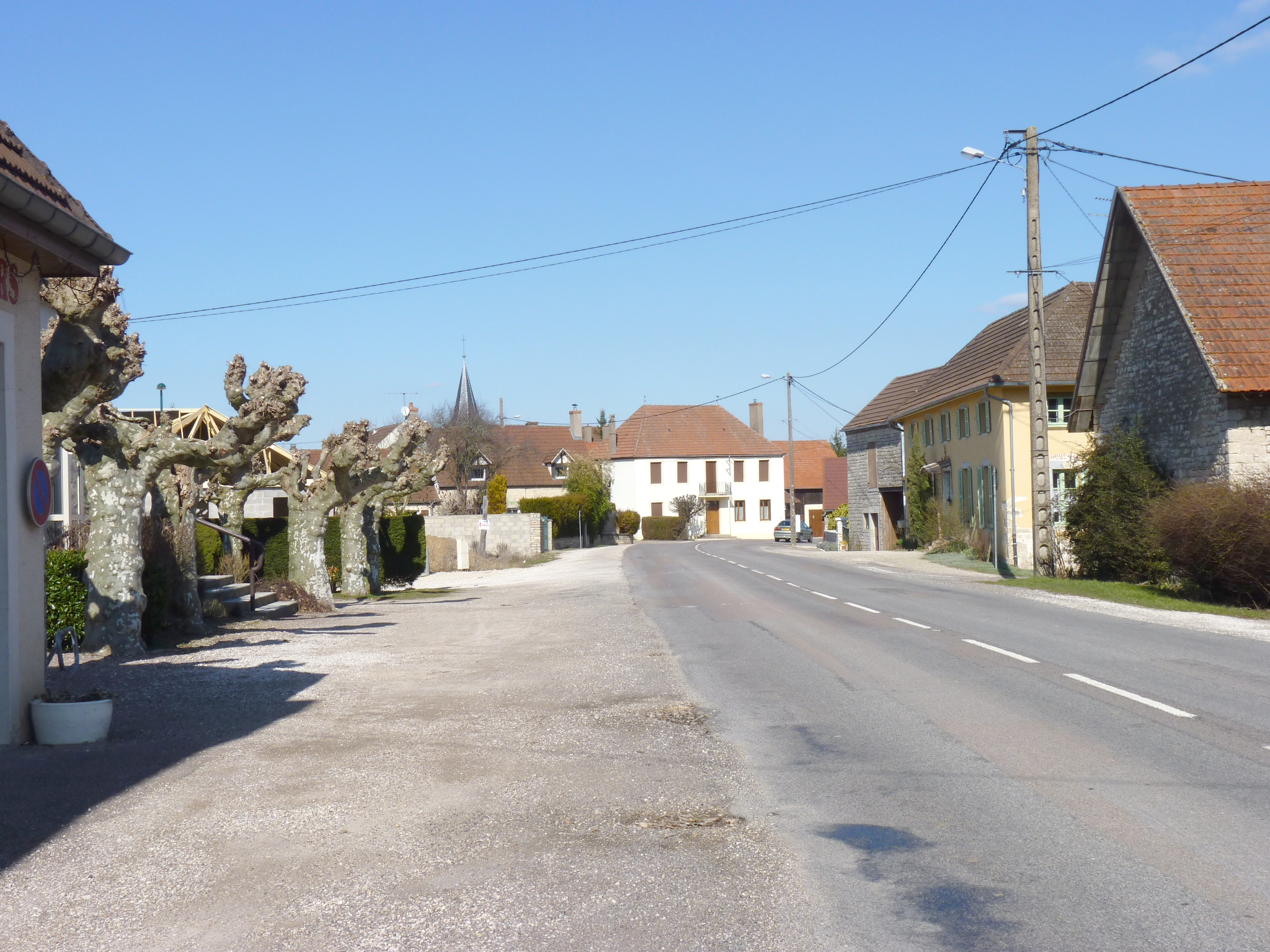
- The main road in Aubigny-en-Plaine
- Location of Aubigny-en-Plaine
- Location within France Location within Bourgogne-Franche-Comté
- Coordinates: 47°07′59″N 5°10′40″E
- Country: France
- Region: Bourgogne-Franche-Comté
- Department: Côte-d'Or
- Arrondissement: Beaune
- Canton: Brazey-en-Plaine
- Intercommunality: CC Rives de Saône

Government
  - Mayor (2020–2026): Manuel Fernandez
- Area^{1}: 6.34 km^{2} (2.45 sq mi)
- Highest elevation: 207 m (679 ft)
- Lowest elevation: 183 m (600 ft)
- Population (2023): 541
  - Density: 85.3/km^{2} (221/sq mi)
- Time zone: UTC+01:00 (CET)
  - Summer (DST): UTC+02:00 (CEST)
- INSEE/Postal code: 21031 /21170
- ^{1} French Land Register data, which excludes lakes, ponds, glaciers > 1 km^{2} (0.386 sq mi or 247 acres) and river estuaries.

Aubigny-en-Plaine (French pronunciation: [obiɲi ɑ̃ plɛn]) is a commune in the Côte-d'Or department in the Bourgogne-Franche-Comté region of eastern France.

== Geography ==
Aubigny-en-Plaine is located some 27 km south by south-east of Dijon, 30 km north-east of Beaune and 17 km east of Nuits-Saint-Georges. Access to the commune is by the D8 road from Brazey-en-Plaine in the east passing through the village then the width of the commune as it goes west to Saint-Nicolas-lès-Cîteaux. The D 34 road comes from Charrey-sur-Saône in the south-west and passes through the village before continuing north to join the D 968 south of Aiserey. The D 20^{G} goes south-east from the village to Esbarres. The western half of the commune is heavily forested while the eastern half is farmland.

The Vouge river forms the eastern border of the commune as it flows south to join the Saône west of Saint-Jean-de-Losne. The Ruisseau du Bas de Bessey forms the northern border of the commune as it flows east to join the Vouge. An unnamed stream flows through the village to the Vouge.

== Administration ==
List of Successive Mayors

From	To	Name
2001	2008	Bernard Roth
2008	2020	Jean Claude Dinet
2020	2026	Manuel Fernandez

== Demography ==
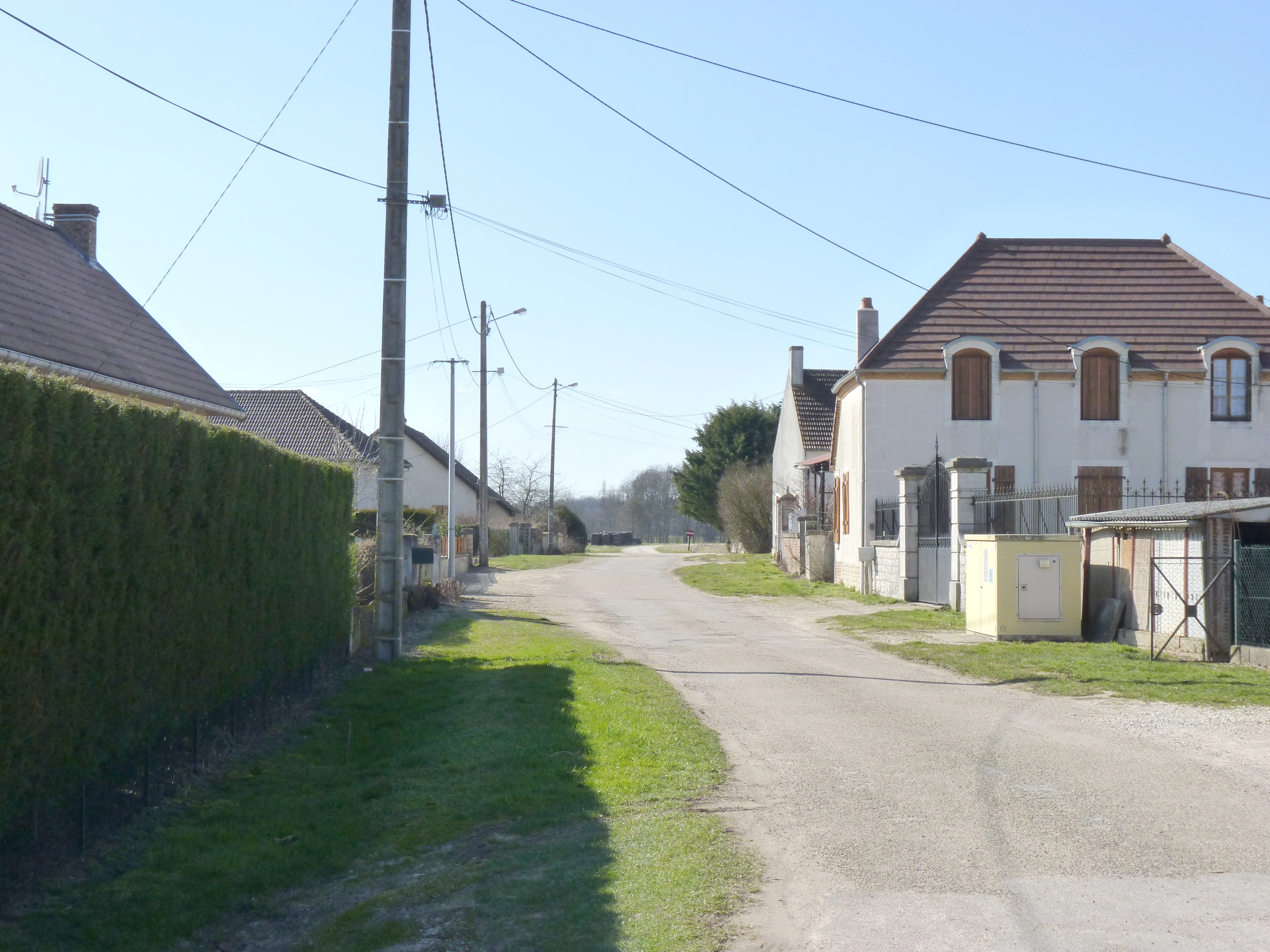
Rue de la Tuilerie

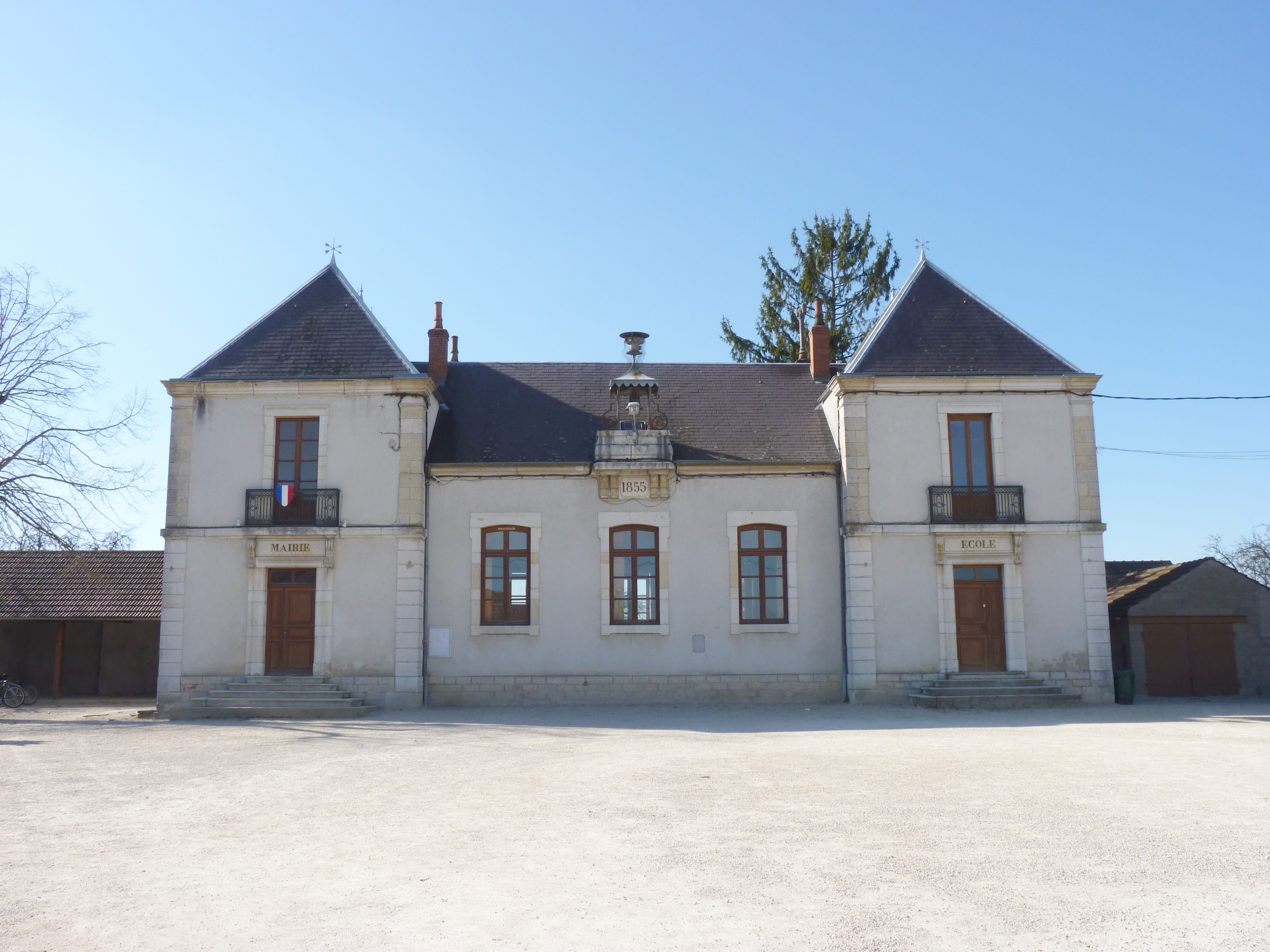
The Town Hall and School

The inhabitants of the commune are known as Albineyais or Albineyaises in French, from the original name of the commune of Albineyum in the 13th century.

Historical population

Year	Pop.	±% p.a.
1793	412	—
1821	454	+0.35%
1846	410	−0.41%
1872	438	+0.25%
1901	337	−0.90%
1926	309	−0.35%
1946	237	−1.32%
1962	237	+0.00%
1968	196	−3.12%

Year	Pop.	±% p.a.
1975	207	+0.78%
1982	265	+3.59%
1990	296	+1.39%
1999	319	+0.83%
2007	341	+0.84%
2012	425	+4.50%
2017	507	+3.59%
2023	541	+1.09%

Source: EHESS and INSEE

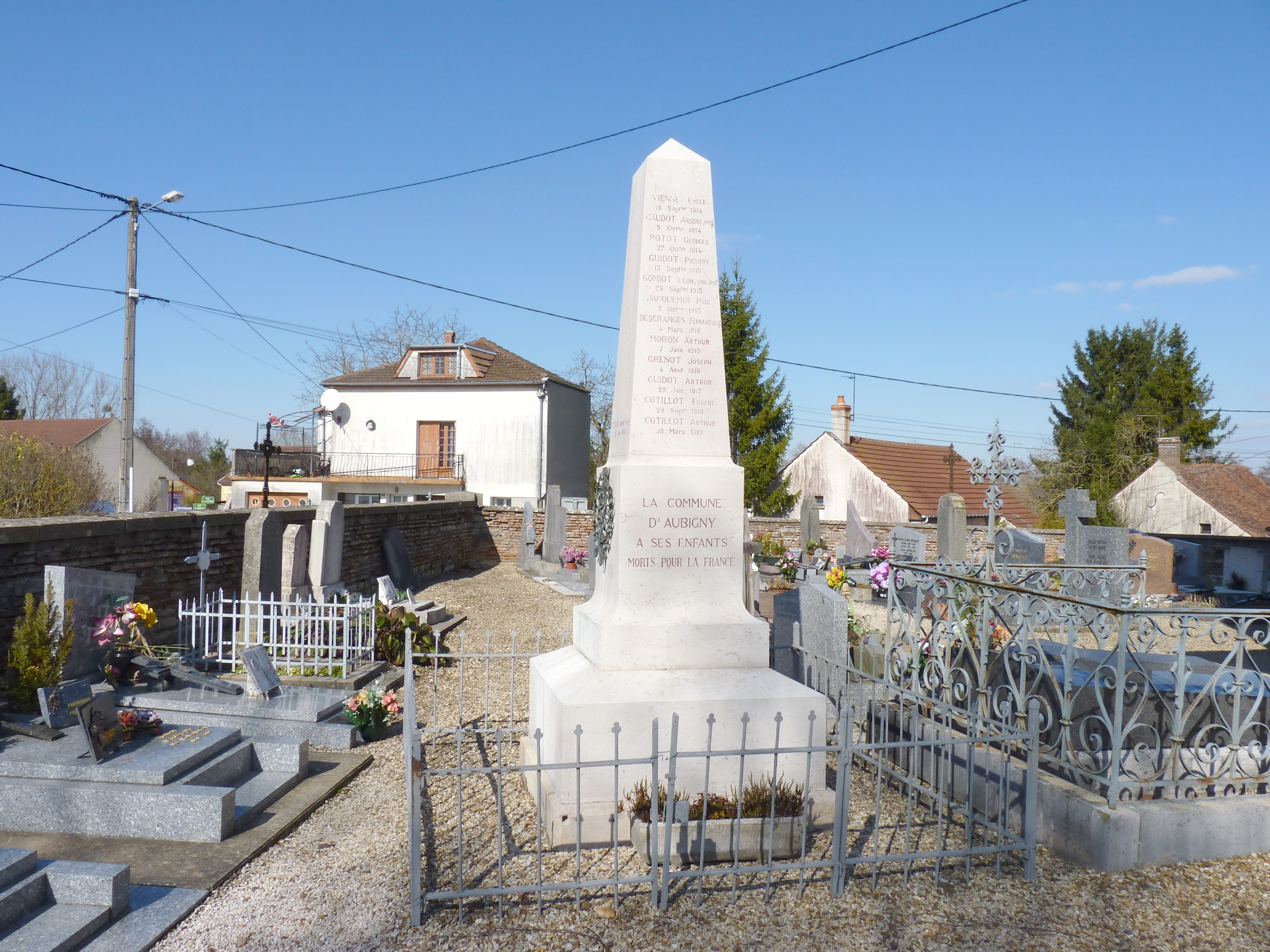
The War Memorial

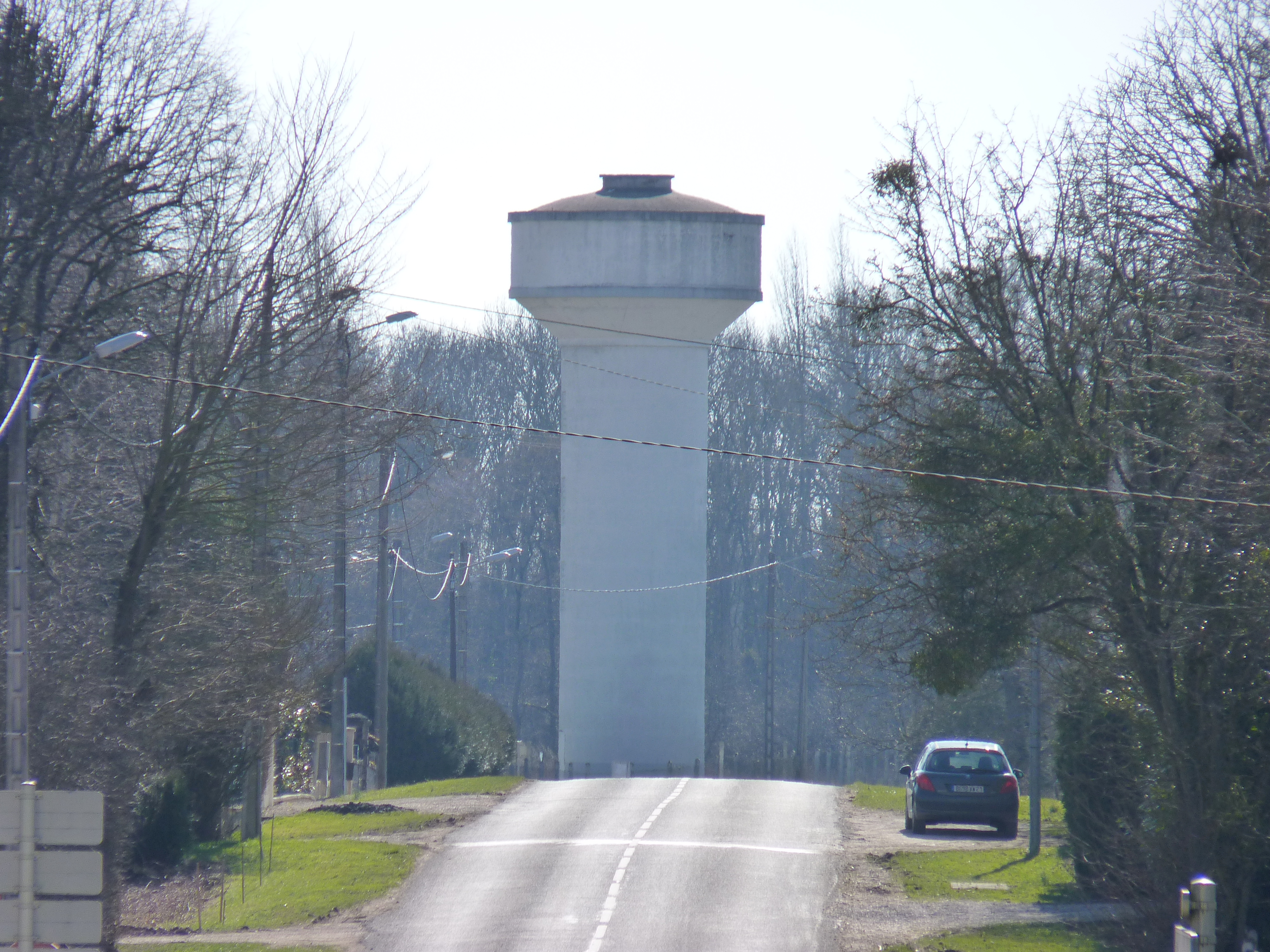
The Water tower

== Sites and monuments ==
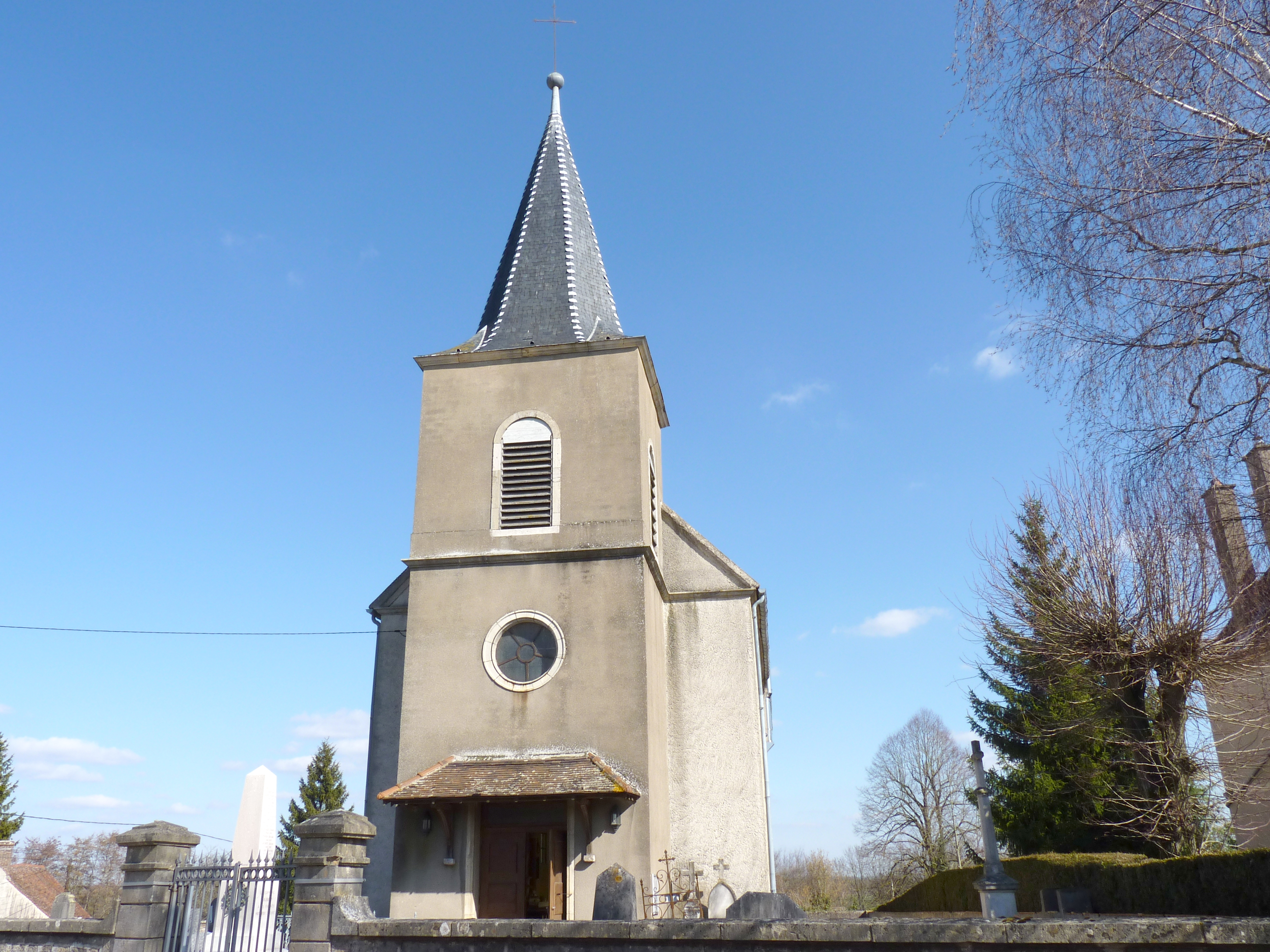
The Church

The Church of Aubigny-en-Plaine has the peculiarity of not having a transept. It has only a Nave. It contains one item that is registered as a historical object:

- A Statue: Saint Vincent (17th century)

Interior of the Church

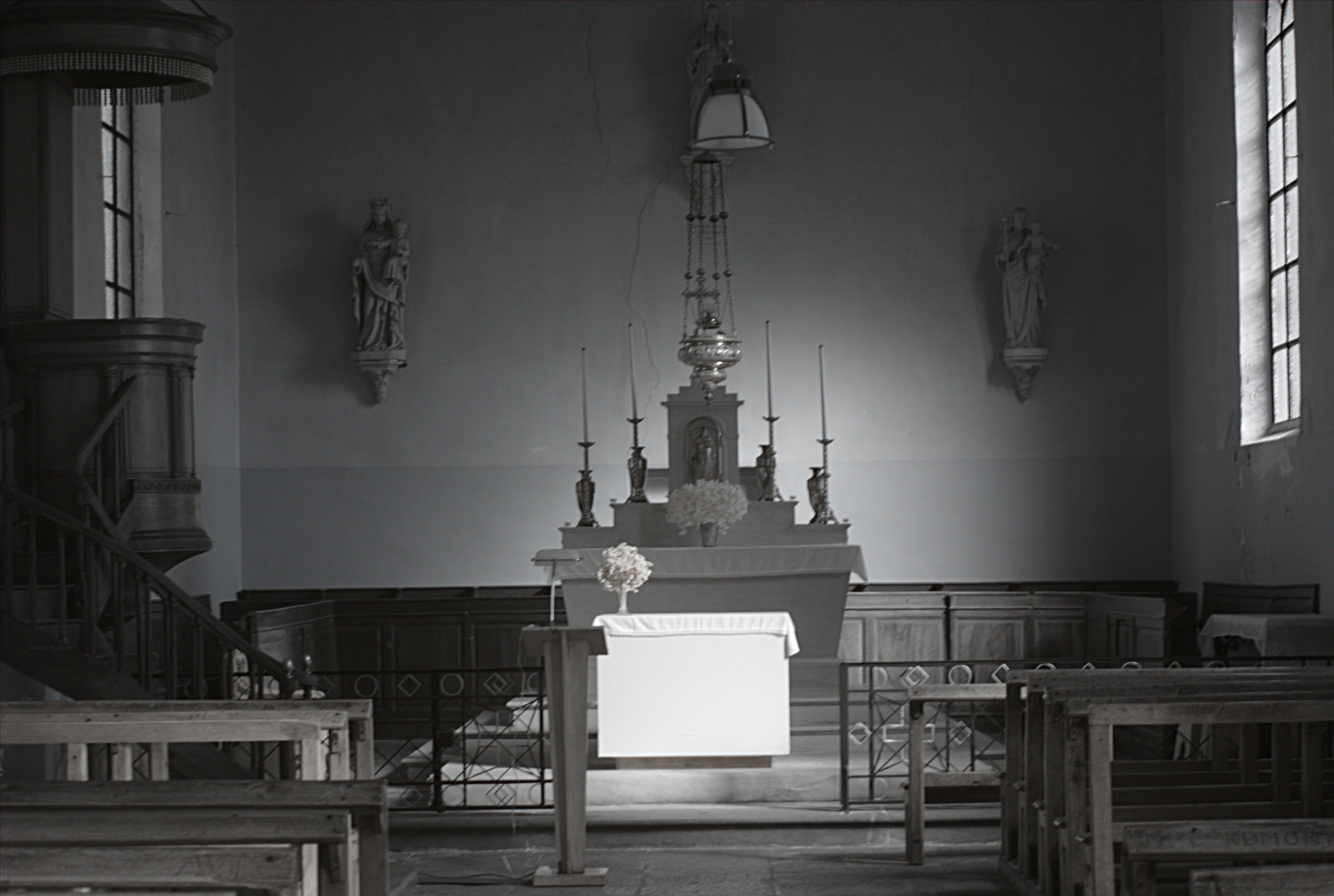
Altar and Choir

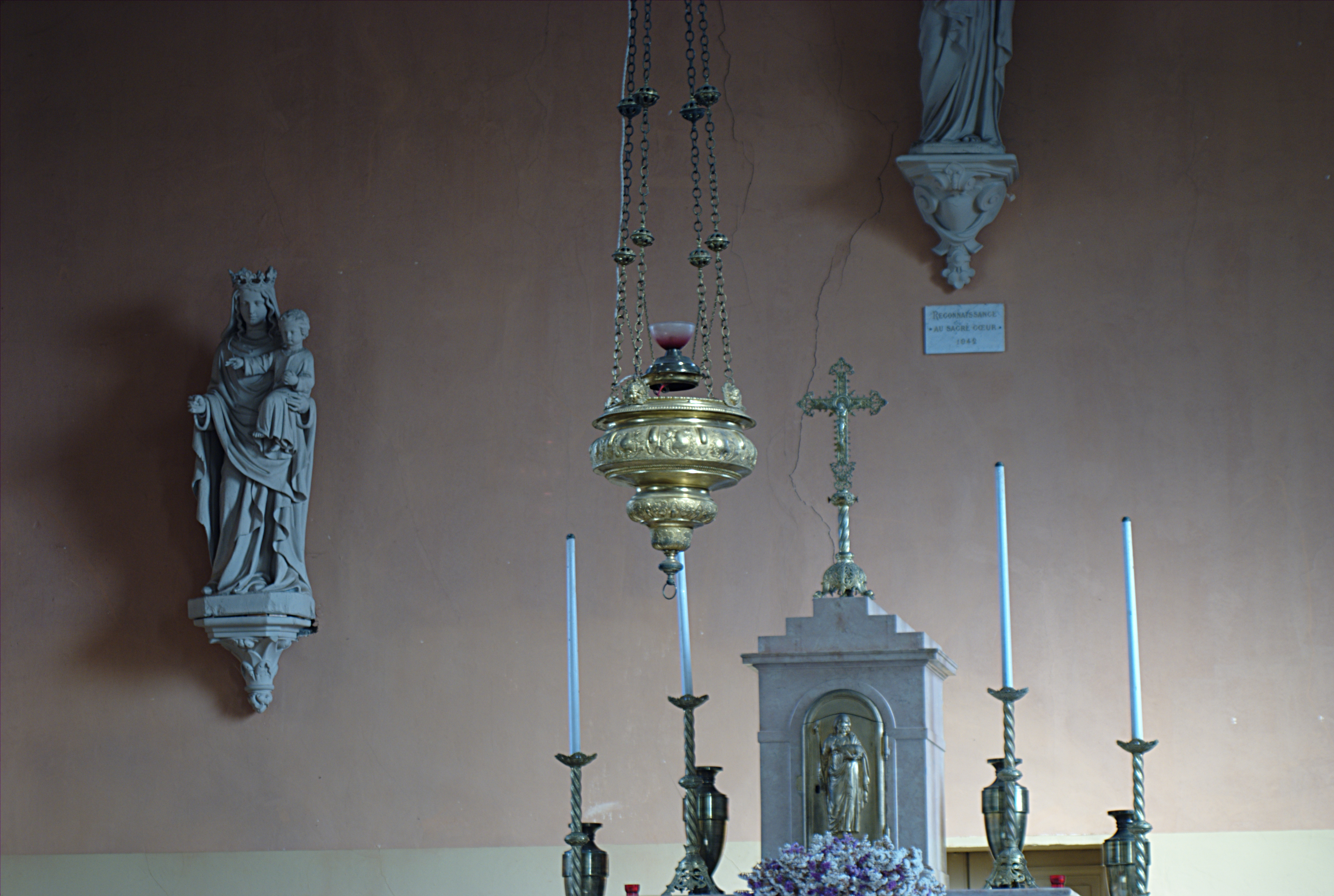
Suspended lamp

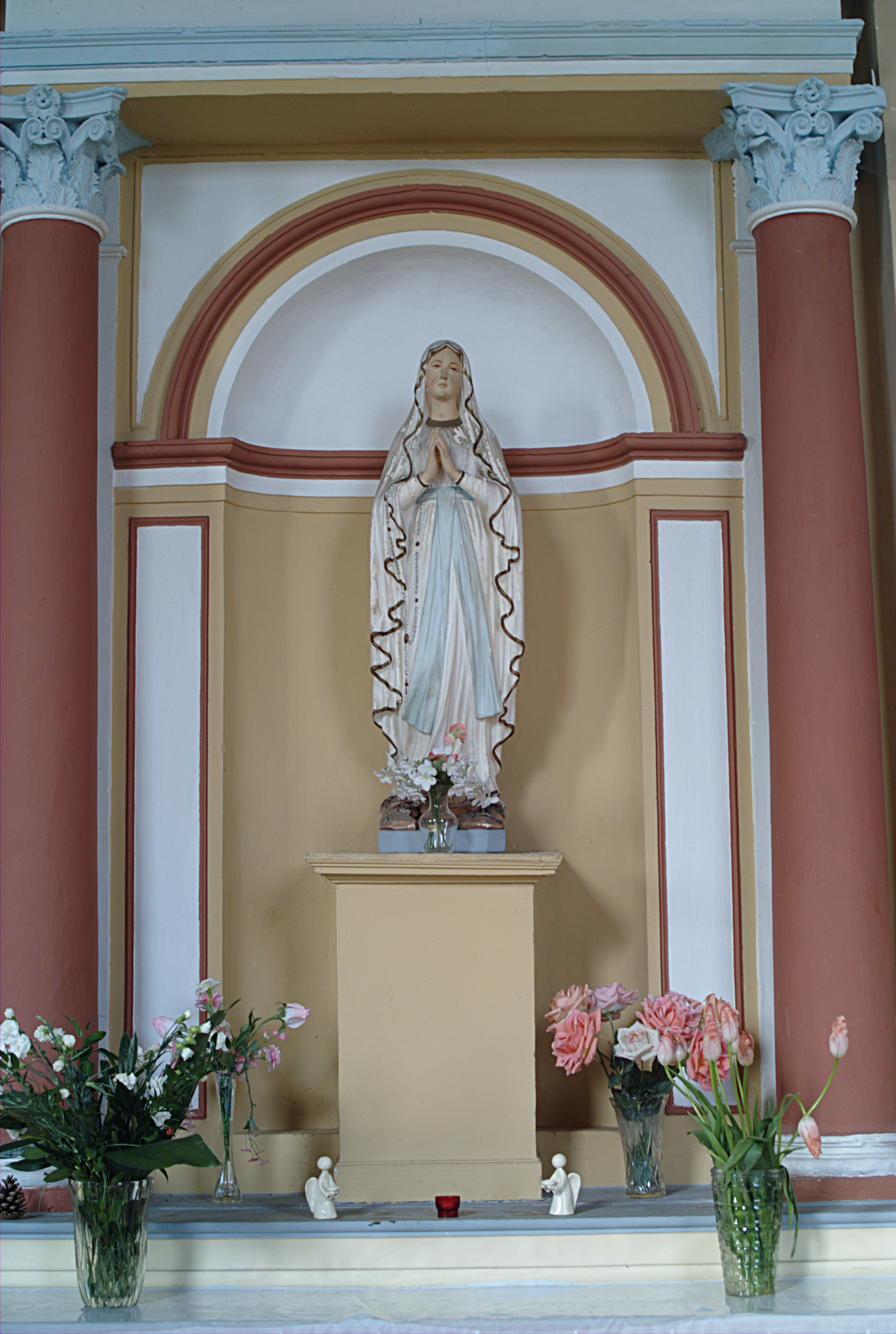
Statue of Saint Mary

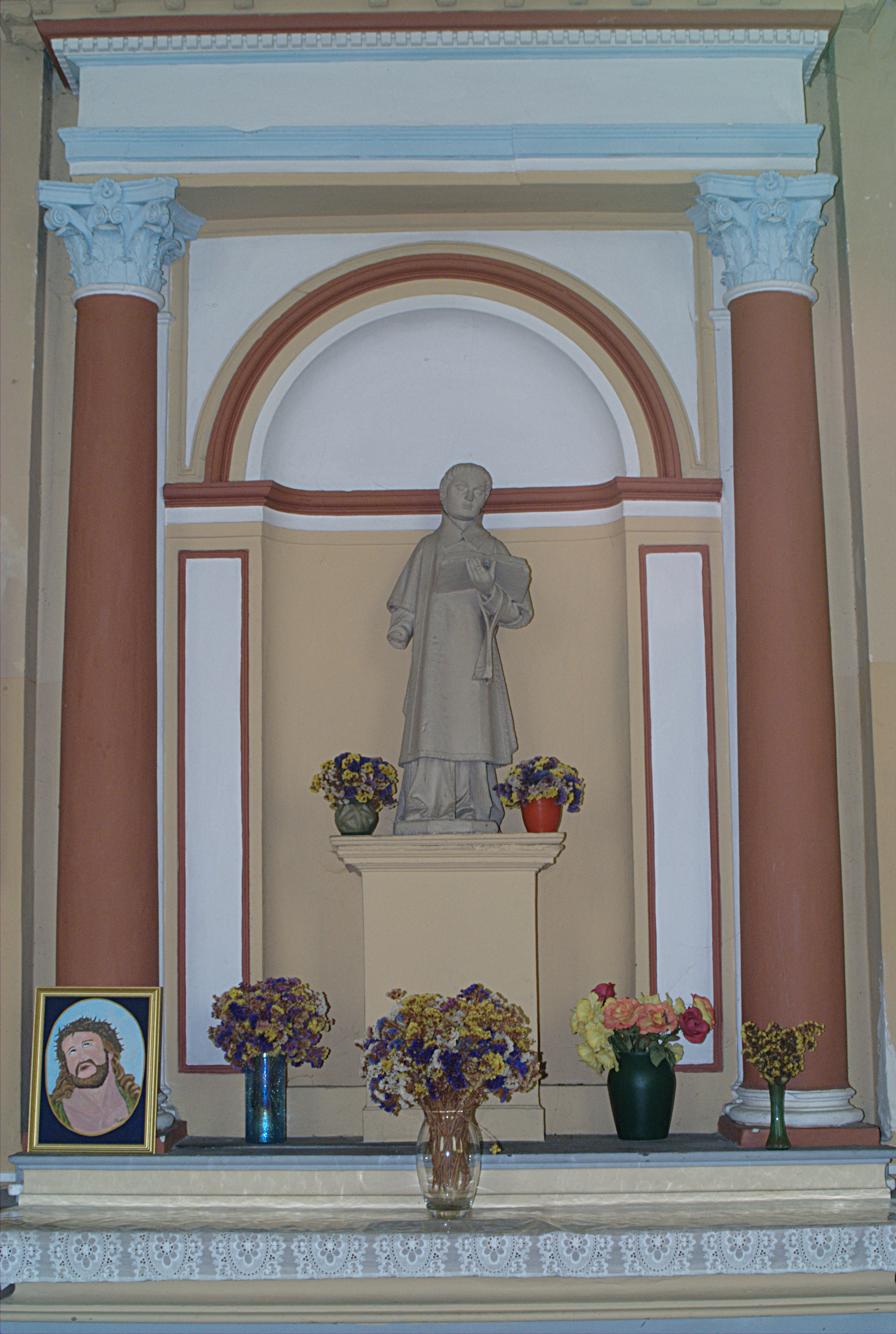
The Statue of Saint Vincent

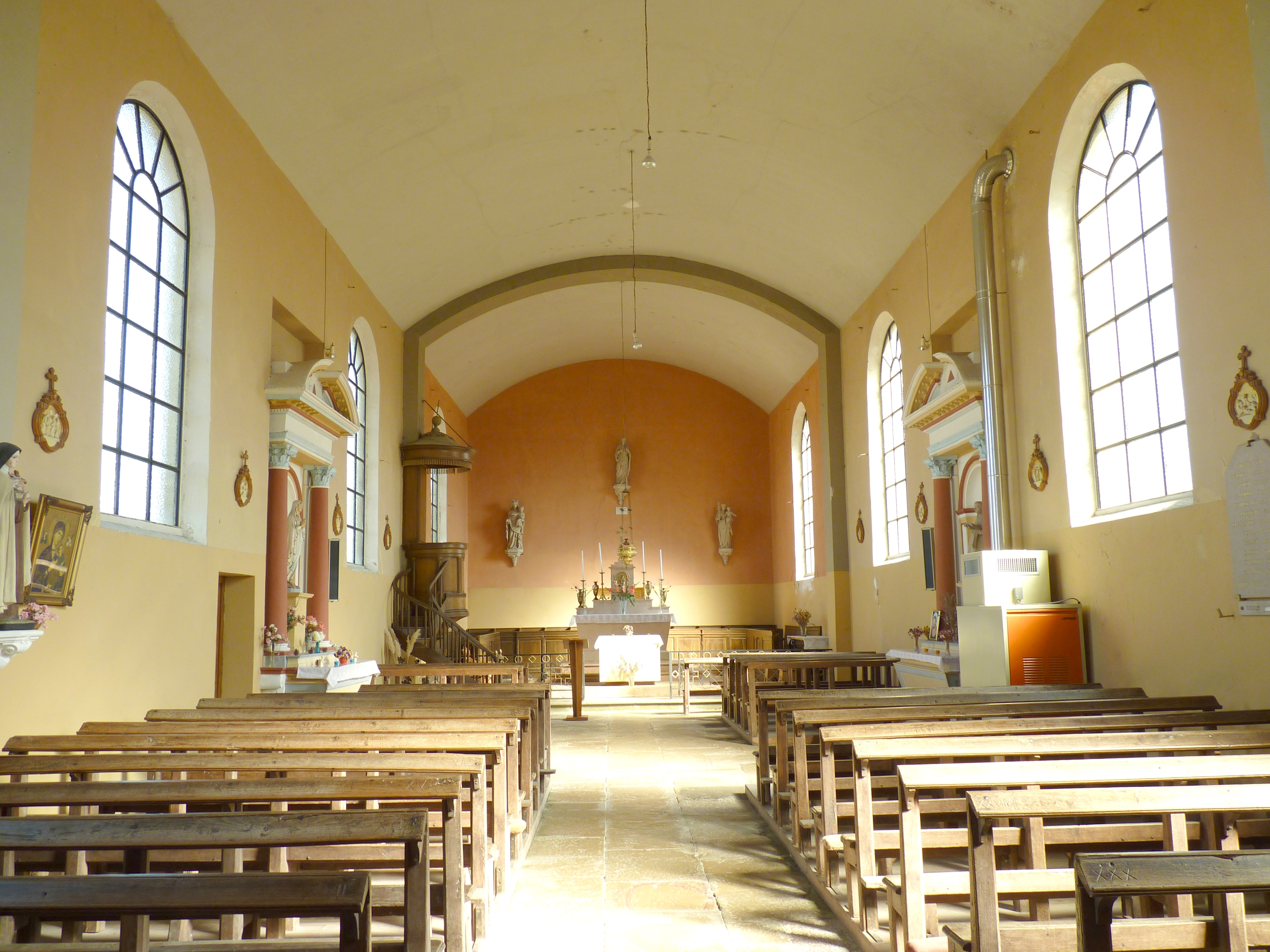
The Nave and Choir

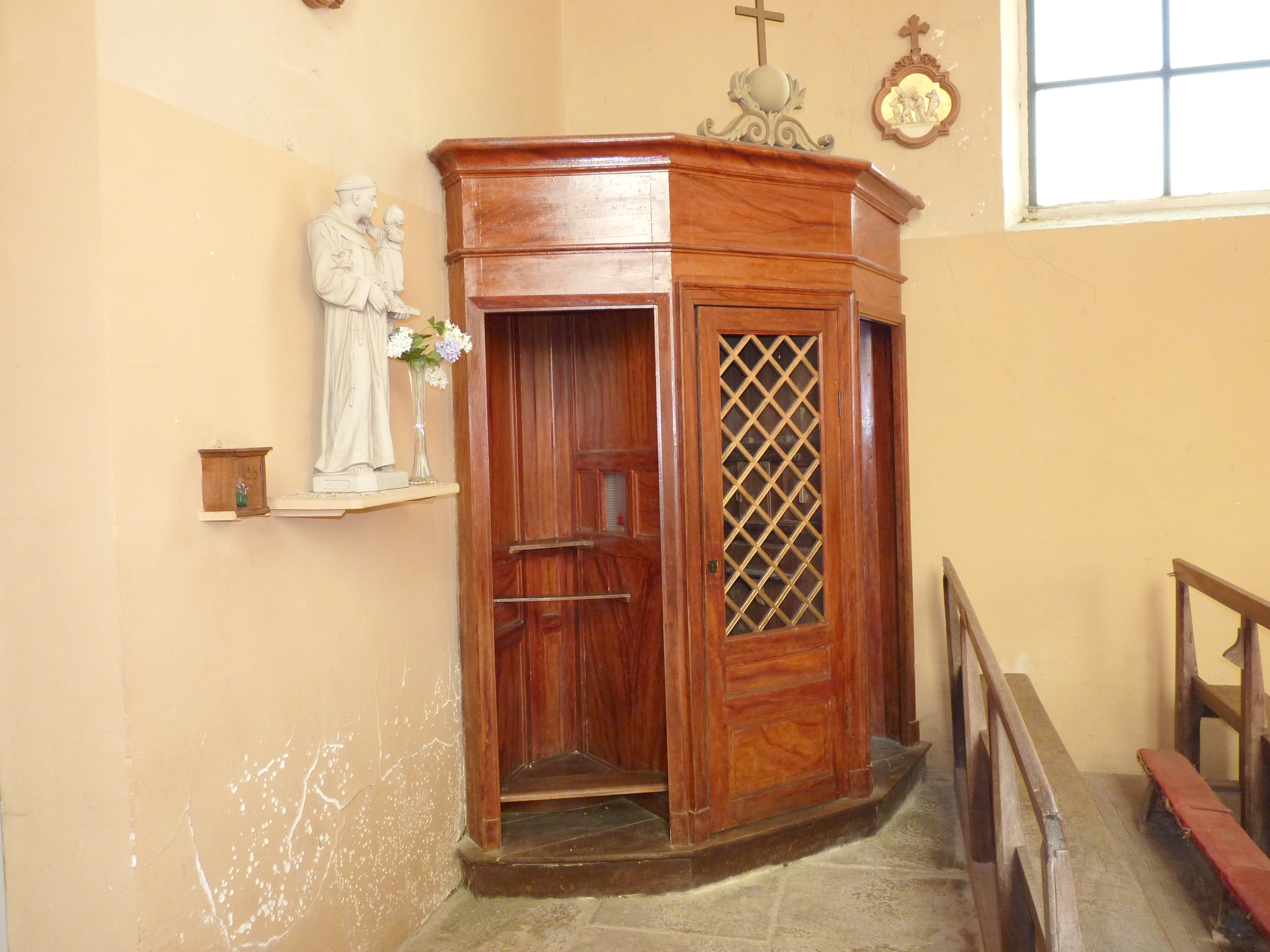
The Confessional

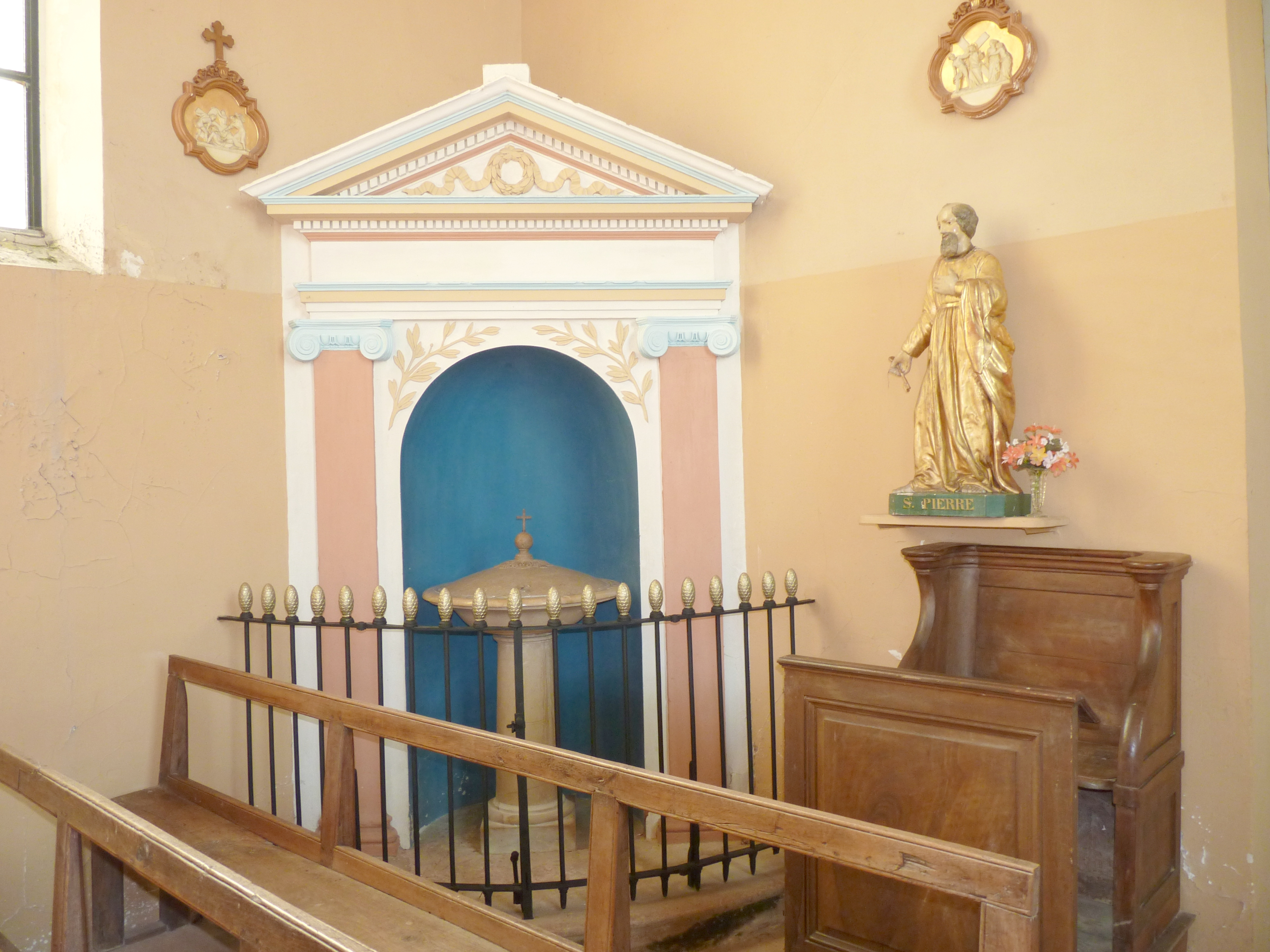
The Baptistery

== See also ==
- Communes of the Côte-d'Or department
