= Canton of La Roche-sur-Yon-2 =

Coordinates: 46.66°N 1.43°W

The canton of La Roche-sur-Yon-2 is an administrative division of the Vendée department, western France. It was created at the French canton reorganisation which came into effect in March 2015. Its seat is in La Roche-sur-Yon.

It consists of the following communes:

1. Aubigny-Les Clouzeaux
2. La Chaize-le-Vicomte
3. Nesmy
4. La Roche-sur-Yon (partly)
