= Sigourney =

Sigourney may refer to:

== People ==
=== Surname ===
- Brita Sigourney (born 1990), American freestyle skier
- Charles Sigourney (1778–1854), American businessman, banker, philanthropist, husband of Lydia Sigourney
- Edith Sigourney (1895–1982), American tennis player
- James Sigourney (c. 1790 – 1813), American naval officer
- Lydia Sigourney (1791–1865), American author and poet

=== Given name ===
- Sigourney Bandjar (born 1984), Surinamese/Dutch footballer
- Father Sigourney Fay, mentor of F. Scott Fitzgerald
- Sigourney Thayer (1896–1944), American theatrical producer and poet
- Sigourney Trask (1849–1936), American physician and missionary
- Sigourney Weaver (born 1949), American actress

=== Stage name ===
- Sigourney Beaver, American drag queen and contestant on The Boulet Brothers' Dragula (season 4)

== Other uses ==
- Sigourney, Iowa, United States, a city
- USS Sigourney, two ships of the United States Navy
- A variant spelling of the French place-name Sigournais (Vendée)
- Sigourney Howard, a minor female character ("Under the name of Mrs. Sigourney Howard … My aunt …") in F. Scott Fitzgerald's novel The Great Gatsby
- Sigourney "Cissy" Davis, a female character in the 2002 American TV series Family Affair
