= Connecticut LGBTQ Film Festival =

LGBTQ film festival in Connecticut, USA

Coordinates: 40.642498°N 111.495143°W

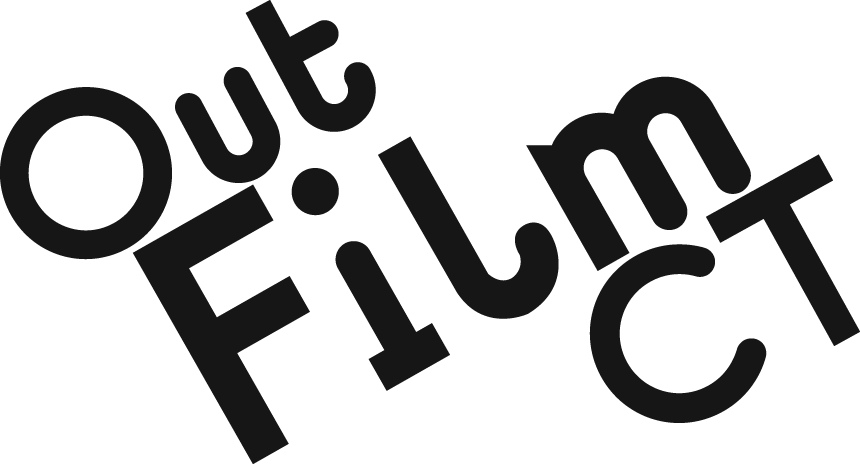
- Location: Hartford, Connecticut, United States
- Founded: 1988
- Website: outfilmct.org

The Connecticut LGBTQ Film Festival, hosted by Out Film CT and held annually in Hartford, Connecticut, is an American film festival with a focus on films created by and for members of the LGBTQ+ community. Established in 1988, it is the longest running film festival in Connecticut. The festival is traditionally held in June, when it's seen as a lead-in to other events during LGBTQ Pride Month. Shane Engstrom has been director or co-director of the festival since 2001. In 2021, Jaime Ortega was appointed as co-director alongside Engstrom.

== History ==
The festival holds screenings at the Trinity College's Cinestudio cinema.

The festival was founded as the Connecticut Gay & Lesbian Film Festival in 1988 by William Mann and Terri Reid, and has run every year since, becoming the longest running film festival in Connecticut. In 2014, the festival was renamed as the Connecticut LGBTQ Film Festival. Festival director Shane Engstrom described the motivation for the name changes as follows:

It’s one of those ever-evolving things. There’s always been a kind of a push-and-pull regarding the term queer. Has it been reclaimed? Are people still offended by the word queer? It seems especially in youth culture kids are quicker to label themselves as queer in order to avoid being given other labels. They embrace the label queer. We wanted to reflect that in the name.

In the late 1980s and early 1990s, the festival struggled to attract audiences due to "lack of publicity" and "gloomy films", however, over the subsequent decades, the festival grew in popularity and "began playing for sold-out crowds", with audiences reaching record numbers at the 32nd annual festival in 2019.

According to Rainbow Times, New England's largest LGBTQ newspaper, the festival is "lauded as the most diverse film festival in the region" and "the screening process is rigorous".

The festival holds its screenings at Trinity College's Cinestudio and it is traditionally held in early June, when it's seen as a lead-in to other events during LGBTQ Pride Month. Films are also shown at other venues, such as The Aetna Theater at the Wadsworth Atheneum. Shane Engstrom has been director or co-director of the festival since 2001. In 2021, Jaime Ortega was appointed as co-director alongside Engstrom.

In October 2020, the festival hosted roughly 100 films from 25 countries, from a record 650 submissions. In an interview with Connecticut Post, Engstrom said the festival's aim is to create programming that "highlights our LGBTQ youth and elders, queer people of color, international perspectives, religion, history, comedies, tragedies, and stories of love." It was entirely virtual due to the ongoing COVID-19 pandemic.

The June 2021 festival scheduled a mix of in-person and virtual screenings.

== Awards ==
Every year, since 2014, the festival awards $500 cash prizes to the winners of several award categories, including Best Film, Best Documentary, Best Director, and the Rising Star Award.
