= USS Wadsworth =

Three ships of the United States Navy have been named USS Wadsworth, in honor of Commodore Alexander S. Wadsworth:

- The first USS Wadsworth (DD-60) was a Tucker-class destroyer launched in 1915 and struck in 1936.
- The second USS Wadsworth (DD-516) was a Fletcher-class destroyer launched in 1943 and served during the final years of World War II. She was transferred to West Germany and renamed Z-3 in 1959. She was transferred to Greece in 1980 and renamed Nearchos; she was stricken in 1991.
- The third USS Wadsworth (FFG-9) was the third ship of the Oliver Hazard Perry class of guided missile frigates, launched in 1978. She was transferred to Poland and renamed ORP Generał Tadeusz Kościuszko in 2002.
