= USS Sigourney =

Two ships in the United States Navy have been named USS Sigourney for James Butler Sigourney.

- The first USS Sigourney (DD-81) was a Wickes-class destroyer from 1918, and was later transferred to the Royal Navy as HMS Newport.
- The second USS Sigourney (DD-643) was a Fletcher-class destroyer from 1943 to 1960.
