= Alexander Wadsworth =

Alexander Wadsworth may refer to:

- Alexander S. Wadsworth, United States Navy officer
- Alexander Wadsworth (landscape designer), American landscape architect and surveyor

== See also ==
- Alexander Wadsworth Longfellow Jr., American architect
