= USS Wadsworth (DD-516) =

Fletcher-class destroyer

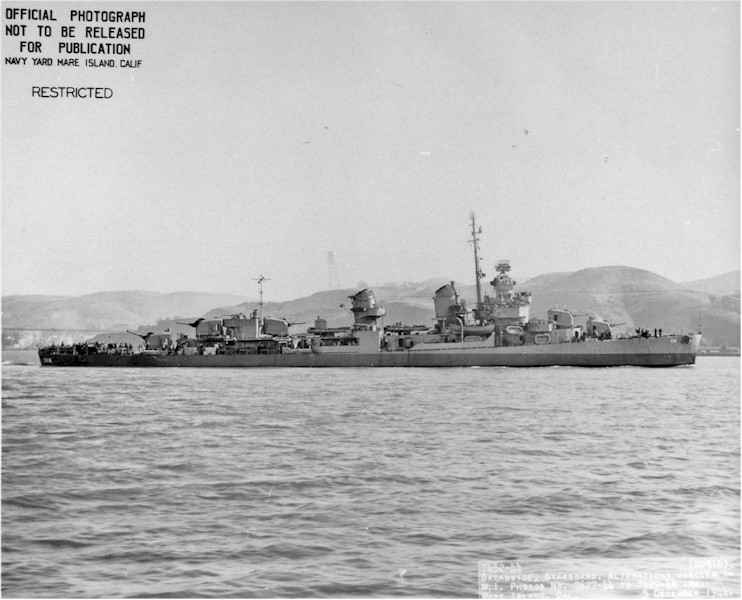

History

United States
- Name: USS Wadsworth
- Namesake: Alexander S. Wadsworth
- Builder: Bath Iron Works
- Laid down: 18 August 1942
- Launched: 10 January 1943
- Sponsored by: Mrs. Rebecca Wadsworth Peacher
- Commissioned: 16 March 1943
- Decommissioned: 18 April 1946
- Stricken: 1 October 1974
- Identification: DD-516
- Fate: Transferred to West German Navy, 6 October 1959

West Germany
- Name: Zerstörer 3
- Acquired: 6 October 1959
- Commissioned: 6 October 1959
- Stricken: 1980
- Identification: D172
- Fate: Transferred to Hellenic Navy, 15 October 1980

Greece
- Name: Nearchos
- Acquired: 15 October 1980
- Stricken: 1991
- Identification: D65
- Fate: Scrapped, 1991

General characteristics
- Class & type: Fletcher-class destroyer; Zerstörer 1-class destroyer
- Displacement: 2,050 long tons (2,080 t)
- Length: 376 ft 6 in (114.76 m)
- Beam: 39 ft 8 in (12.09 m)
- Draft: 17 ft 9 in (5.41 m)
- Propulsion: 60,000 shp (45 MW) ; 2 propellers
- Speed: 35 knots (65 km/h; 40 mph)
- Range: 6,500 nmi (12,000 km; 7,500 mi) at 15 knots (28 km/h; 17 mph)
- Complement: 329
- Armament: 5 × single Mk 12 5 in (127 mm)/38 guns; 5 × twin 40 mm (1.6 in) Bofors AA guns; 7 × single 20 mm (0.8 in) Oerlikon AA guns; 2 × quintuple 21 in (533 mm) torpedo tubes; 6 × single depth charge throwers; 2 × depth charge racks

USS Wadsworth (DD-516), a Fletcher-class destroyer, was the second ship of the United States Navy to be named for Commodore Alexander S. Wadsworth (1790–1851). The ship was commissioned in 1943 during World War II. After seeing extensive action during the war, the ship was placed in reserve following it. In 1959 the destroyer was loaned to the West German Navy and renamed Zerstörer 3. She remained a part of the West German Navy until 1980 when the destroyer was transferred to the Hellenic Navy and renamed Nearchos. Nearchos was active until 1991 when she was sold for scrap.

== Construction and career ==
Wadsworth was laid down on 18 August 1942 at Bath, Maine, by the Bath Iron Works. The destroyer was launched on 10 January 1943; sponsored by Mrs. Rebecca Wadsworth Peacher, the great-great-granddaughter of Commodore Alexander S. Wadsworth; and commissioned at the Boston Navy Yard, on 16 March 1943.

Wadsworth departed Boston on 5 April and conducted exercises in Casco Bay, Maine, until 15 April, when she sailed for Cuban waters. After shakedown training out of Guantanamo Bay, the new destroyer steamed north for post-shakedown availability and voyage repairs in the Boston Navy Yard.

Putting to sea on 23 May, Wadsworth screened the aircraft carriers Princeton and Yorktown out of Port of Spain, Trinidad, as they conducted training evolutions. Following that cruise, Wadsworth touched at Norfolk, Virginia, on 17 June and returned to Boston the following day.

After escorting the aircraft carrier Bunker Hill to Hampton Roads, Virginia, Wadsworth screened Cowpens and planeguarded for that carrier as her air group trained off the Virginia Capes. Following a return to Boston, the destroyer got underway again on 20 July to rendezvous with a task group formed around the carriers Lexington, Princeton, and Belleau Wood. She met the carriers off the Delaware breakwater, and the warships then set a southerly course, bound for the Panama Canal.

Reaching Pearl Harbor on 9 August, Wadsworth spent 10 days in the Hawaiian operating area before heading for Canton Island in the screen for the carrier Prince William. Subsequently, touching Espiritu Santo, in the New Hebrides Islands, Wadsworth reported to Rear Admiral Aubrey W. Fitch, Commander, Aircraft, South Pacific (ComAirSoPac), for duty.

On the last day of August 1943, Wadsworth cleared Espiritu Santo to hunt for the Japanese submarine—later identified as I-20—that had torpedoed and damaged the tanker W. S. Rheem about 10 miles (16 km) north of Bougainville Strait. Wadsworth made no contact with any submarines in the first area searched but then teamed with amphibious patrol planes to scour the seas to the south of Espiritu Santo and west of Malakula Island.

Her diligence was soon rewarded. On 1 September, Wadsworth picked up an underwater sound contact and dropped seven patterns of depth charges and claimed unconfirmed damage to the submersible. I-20 may have survived that onslaught but never returned home. Records list her as "missing" as of 10 October 1943.

Putting into Havannah Harbor, Efate Island, on 6 September, Wadsworth then exercised with a task force formed around the carrier Saratoga. The destroyer subsequently cleared that port on 17 September in company with the mine-laying destroyer Tracy and, over the ensuing days, escorted a convoy of supply ships to Kukum beach, Guadalcanal.

Returning to Efate with empty cargo ships on 30 September, Wadsworth took a screening station near the battleship South Dakota to escort her to the west for a rendezvous with a cruiser-battleship striking force under the command of Rear Admiral Willis A. Lee. Wadsworth then patrolled off Meli Bay, Efate, to cover the entrance of convoys into Havannah Harbor.

Wadsworth subsequently joined other units of Destroyer Division 45 (DesDiv 45) as part of the protective screen for a dozen troop transports, Task Group 31.5 (TG 31.5), bound for the Solomons and the initial landings of men in Empress Augusta Bay, Cape Torokina, Bougainville. The expeditionary force arrived off the beach at Cape Torokina in the early morning darkness on 1 November. Then Wadsworth led in the initial force, a group of minesweepers, into Empress Augusta Bay.

At 05:47, Wadsworth's 5-inch (127 mm) guns began to bark, and her shells destroyed enemy barges along the shoreline. For nearly two hours, the warship blasted targets behind the beaches, before she and sister ship Sigourney took a patrol station to protect the transports which were landing troops. Suddenly, six enemy planes plunged out of the sun at the two destroyers, and the first of six bombs exploded only 25 yards (23 m) to starboard of Wadsworth. Two other bombs burst within 500 yards (460 m) of her beam, one to starboard and one to port. Then, a near-miss 20 feet (6.1 m) from her port side sprayed the after section of the ship with fragments that killed two Wadsworth sailors and wounded nine others. On the other hand, the two destroyers each destroyed two of the attackers.

Standing out of the unloading area on the night of 1 November, Wadsworth patrolled off Koli Point, Guadalcanal. Early in the morning a week later, the destroyer returned to Bougainville, escorting the second echelon of troop transports to Empress Augusta Bay. On this occasion, Wadsworth took a fighter-director station off the transport area and assisted in repelling a noon enemy air attack, her guns claiming one dive bomber and one torpedo plane.

Clearing Cape Torokina shortly before midnight, Wadsworth patrolled off Guadalcanal until 10 November, when she moved to Purvis Bay, Florida Island. However, she soon returned to Bougainville's coastal waters, escorting a troop convoy. The destroyer arrived off Cape Torokina near midnight on 12 November and, before dawn, had repelled two torpedo attacks with her radar-controlled 5-inch gunnery.

Wadsworth operated in support of the Bougainville occupation through the end of 1944, escorting troop-and supply-laden convoys from Kukum beach, Guadalcanal, to Empress Augusta Bay. From time to time, she also carried out shore bombardment missions. Three days after Christmas 1943, she blasted Japanese trenches and gun emplacements on both the south and north sides of the mouth of the Reini River, aided by air spot.

=== 1944 ===
After returning to Purvis Bay from her last screening and escort missions in support of the Bougainville operation, Wadsworth departed the Solomons on 8 January 1944, bound for Pago Pago, American Samoa, escorting a merchantman. She returned to Espiritu Santo shepherding the replenishment ship Shasta, before she steamed to Guadalcanal as part of the escort for the transport West Point. She then put into Blanche Harbor, Treasury Islands, on 1 February.

That day, Wadsworth conducted an anti-shipping sweep off the Buka Passage, trading shells with an enemy shore battery on Buka Island, before she entered Bougainville Strait in company with the destroyers Waller and Halford. The three destroyers then proceeded to bombard the newly constructed Japanese airfield at Choiseul Island.

Subsequently, taking on ammunition at Hawthorne Sound, New Georgia, Wadsworth left on the night of 1 February to exercise with motor torpedo boats off Rendova. The following day off Blanche Harbor, she joined the screen for a convoy of landing craft and cargo ships that had arrived off Cape Torokina on 4 February.

Near midnight, she helped to repel enemy air attacks on the Torokina beaches, before she left the area the next morning, screening the tanker Patapsco to Purvis Bay.

Clearing Purvis Bay on 11 February, Wadsworth rendezvoused with destroyers and troop-laden LSTs off Munda, New Georgia, bound for the Green Islands. Before dawn on 15 February, Wadsworth, acting as fighter-director ship, vectored night fighters toward an enemy raid of five planes that dropped flares off the formation. As a result of the destroyer's instructions, the prowling night fighters knocked down one enemy floatplane. At dawn, Wadsworth vectored fighters against another raid, during which they splashed three intruders and repelled the enemy without damage to any ship of the formation. Wadsworth then screened the transports as they disembarked their troops.

After putting into Purvis Bay on the night of 17 February, Wadsworth steamed to Kukum beach and joined a troop convoy earmarked for the Green Island occupation. After her charges had safely delivered their troops to the objective on 20 February, Wadsworth returned to Purvis Bay the next afternoon.

Getting underway on 23 February, Wadsworth steamed via St. George's Channel to Kavieng, New Ireland, and to Rabaul, New Britain, for an anti-shipping sweep. A few minutes after midnight on 24 February, the destroyer opened fire and shelled a supply dump, stowage houses, and enemy troop concentrations in that area. One salvo of 5-inch shells started a fierce fire that lit up the entire target area. The flames from that blaze were still glowing as Wadsworth and the rest of the bombardment force stood down St. George's Channel three hours later.

With Purvis Bay as her base of operations, Wadsworth escorted supply convoys to Green Island and from Guadalcanal to Cape Torokina until 17 March. That day, the destroyer joined the screen for high-speed transports (APDs) setting course from Guadalcanal for the landings on Emirau Island.

On the morning of 19 March, Wadsworth took a patrol station near Emirau and remained in the vicinity, supporting the operation, until sunset on 20 March. She subsequently conducted two more Guadalcanal-to-Emirau runs—escorting troopships—that kept her busy through mid-April.

After a period of rest and recreation at Sydney, Australia, Wadsworth returned to Havannah Harbor on 10 May. Assigned to duty with Battleship Division 3 (BatDiv 3)—comprising Idaho, New Mexico, and Pennsylvania—Wadsworth engaged in battle maneuvers and training off the New Hebrides in preparation for the conquest of the Marianas. While his ship lay moored in Havannah Harbor on 31 May, Wadsworth's commanding officer, Comdr. John F. Walsh, was given the additional duty of Commander, Destroyer Division 90 (DesDiv 90), and broke his pennant in his ship.

On 2 June, Wadsworth and the other destroyers in her squadron and with BatDiv 3 formed Task Group 53.14 (TG 53.14) and cleared Havannah Harbor, bound for the Marianas. At 04:30 on 14 June, the destroyer joined the screen of Pennsylvania, Idaho, and the cruiser Honolulu for the bombardment of shore installations on eastern Tinian. She completed the initial phase of her operations in the Marianas on the 16th by screening bombardment-force cruisers and battleships off Guam.

After refuelling off Saipan, Wadsworth joined Vice Admiral Marc A. Mitscher's Task Force 58 (TF 58) on the afternoon of 17 June, becoming a part of TG 58.3, formed around the veteran aircraft carrier Enterprise in TF 58's bid to repel the First Japanese Mobile Fleet then on its way to the Marianas. On the morning of 19 June, TG 58.3 came under attack from Japanese carrier- and land-based aircraft during the beginning of what history would record as the Battle of the Philippine Sea.

Sometimes known as the "Great Marianas Turkey Shoot", that battle sounded the death knell for the Imperial Japanese Navy. During the action, the enemy lost 395 carrier planes and 31 floatplanes—about 92% and 72% of its total strength in those categories. At the end of its ill-fated effort to defend the Marianas, the Japanese Navy retained the operational use of only 35 carrier planes and 12 float planes. Besides the losses afloat, the Japanese lost some 50 land-based bombers as well.

During the two-day battle, Vice Admiral Mitscher's fliers had done well, turning back the enemy raids before they reached the American fleet. As TF 58 steamed westward to destroy the fleeing enemy on 20 June, Mitscher ordered further air strikes—attacks that sank the Japanese carrier Hiyō.

Mitscher had taken a calculated risk, however, launching the last strikes so late in the day. As the planes droned home in the gathering darkness, the admiral faced an agonizing decision. Many planes would be lost if they could not see their carriers. On the other hand, if the ships were illuminated, enemy submarines might also see the vital carriers. Mitscher ordered the lights turned on. Meanwhile, Wadsworth and other destroyers received orders to pick up any fliers who were forced to "ditch."

When TF 58 had reached a point some 300 miles (480 km) off Okinawa, it abandoned further pursuit of the Japanese. Wadsworth then returned to the Marianas and patrolled off Saipan. On 5 July, her commanding officer was relieved of his collateral duties as ComDesDiv 90.

Two days later, Wadsworth joined a cruiser-destroyer force under Rear Admiral C. Turner Joy for the bombardment of Tinian. The destroyer and her mates soon shifted their attention to Guam and destroyed many shore installations and gasoline dumps at Apra Harbor and Agana Harbor, besides blasting enemy airstrips well in advance of the landings scheduled for that island. Terminating her bombardment duties off Guam on the afternoon of 12 July, Wadsworth joined the screen for the retiring carriers, Coral Sea and Corregidor, and reached Eniwetok, in the Marshall Islands, on 15 July.

However, the respite provided by that in-port period was brief, for Wadsworth proceeded to sea on 17 July, as part of the escort for troop-laden transports slated to put their combat-garbed marines and soldiers ashore on Guam. Wadsworth patrolled off that isle as those men splashed ashore and, while engaged in that duty 26 miles (42 km) offshore, picked up eight natives of Guam, who had escaped from the Japanese, on the morning of 22 July. The destroyer quickly transferred them to George Clymer, because they possessed valuable intelligence information on Japanese dispositions ashore.

Wadsworth's guns again spoke in the invasion of Guam on the night of 24 and 25 July, before she took a radar picket station between Guam and Rota Islands. Relieved by the destroyer Hudson on 2 August, Wadsworth then spent four days acting as primary fighter-director ship off Agana beach for two divisions of fighters based on the carriers Belleau Wood, Langley, and Essex. Relieved of that duty on 6 August, Wadsworth departed Guam on 10 August, screening fleet oilers as they withdrew to Eniwetok.

Pressing on from the Marshalls for Hawaiian waters on 13 August as escort for a merchantman, Wadsworth reached Pearl Harbor on the 20th. She then operated off Oahu on radar picket patrols. She departed Hawaiian waters on 15 September as part of the escort for the carriers Natoma Bay and Manila Bay, heading for the Marshalls. Arriving there on 25 September, the destroyer reported for duty with the 3d Fleet.

That tour of duty proved brief, however; for, soon thereafter, Wadsworth sailed for the West Coast of the United States. Proceeding via Eniwetok, Ulithi, and Pearl Harbor, the destroyer arrived at the Mare Island Navy Yard on 25 October for a major overhaul and completed that period of repairs and alterations on 5 December.

Wadsworth—shifted from DesRon 45 to DesRon 24—then conducted refresher training evolutions at San Diego before departing San Francisco five days before Christmas and heading for the Hawaiian Islands as an escort for a convoy. The destroyer safely conducted her charges into Oahu's waters on 29 December 1944.

=== 1945 ===
After local maneuvers out of Pearl Harbor—during which she rescued three aviators from the water on 2 January 1945—Wadsworth set course via Ulithi for the Kossol Passage, Palau Islands.

Reaching the Palaus on 16 January, Wadsworth relieved the destroyer Lansdowne as tender for four minesweepers and two subchasers (SCs) engaged in patrols between Peleliu and Angaur Islands. In the early morning darkness two days later, she illuminated a target heading for the transport area and received information that there were no friendly small craft in the vicinity. Wadsworth's searchlight continued to illuminate the small boat—a barge—as it beached, where Army searchlights ashore soon fixed their beams upon it. Men began to debark from the craft, just as small arms fire began to crackle. Some 50 Japanese troops had attempted a daring raid to damage American aircraft on the ground and destroy ammunition, only to be foiled by Wadsworth and the Army troops ashore. The Japanese landing party was exterminated.

During the night of 19 January, Wadsworth provided illuminating gunfire support for troops on "Amber" beach, Peleliu, before she sailed on 25 January for Ulithi. There, she joined the screen of TG 51.1, a transport group slated to take part in the invasion of Iwo Jima.

Touching at Apra Harbor, Guam, between 8 and 16 February, Wadsworth arrived off Iwo Jima on the morning of 19 February. The destroyer then conducted antisubmarine patrols off the southern tip of the island until nightfall, when she joined a bombardment group. The next morning, Wadsworth took station in the fire support sector off Iwo Jima and blasted enemy tanks and mortar and rocket positions. She continued that action in support of the ground troops ashore until the afternoon of the 21st, when she resumed screening duty for transports carrying the occupation force which ultimately landed on 2 March.

Clearing Iwo Jima on 5 March, Wadsworth headed for the Philippines, arriving at Dulag anchorage, in Leyte Gulf, on the 9th. For most of the rest of March, Wadsworth operated locally in Philippine waters, conducting bombardment and fire support exercises in San Pedro Bay, off Leyte, until 27 March. On that day, the destroyer got underway, screening the sortie of a transport group bound for the Ryūkyūs.

Wadsworth arrived off Okinawa on the morning of 1 April 1945—Easter Sunday, April Fools' Day, and D day for that operation. At 04:15, the destroyer completed an advance sweep ahead of the transports off the invasion beaches and then took a fire support station off the southern end of the island. For the next 15 days, Wadsworth's guns blasted Japanese troop concentrations and gun emplacements, as well as caves where the fanatical defenders had holed-up.

On 17 April, Wadsworth took on board a fighter-director team at Kerama Retto; and technicians from the command ship Estes assisted the destroyer's ship's force in installing fighter-director equipment. She sailed later that day on her first radar picket assignment, part of the early warning network to provide the alarm of incoming Japanese aircraft. From 17 April to 24 June, Wadsworth carried out nine assignments on station, repelling 22 attacks by enemy aircraft, shooting down six, and assisting in the destruction of seven others. In addition, the combat air patrol fighters that she directed splashed 28 enemy aircraft.

During one day of that duty, on 28 April 1945, Wadsworth repelled six determined attacks by 12 enemy aircraft. The raids—which came from all points of the compass—commenced at sunset and continued for over three hours. One enemy torpedo plane closed fast on her port beam as Wadsworth skillfully maneuvered to keep the enemy on the beam to allow a heavy concentration of antiaircraft fire. Frustrated in his first attempt, the enemy pilot then brought the plane around a second time, circling to the right to commence an attack from directly astern, strafing as he came.

Wadsworth maneuvered to port as the plane went into a power dive that took him within 30 feet (9.1 m) of the waves before he passed the destroyer to starboard at a distance of about 100 yards (91 m). The Japanese then zoomed sharply and turned to cross in front of Wadsworth. He then opened the range before boring in low and fast on the third attack.

Wadsworth's determined adversary then dropped a torpedo at 1,200 yards (1,100 m). The destroyer turned "left full" and the "fish" passed harmlessly by her starboard side. Meanwhile, under constant fire from every gun in Wadsworth that could be brought to bear, the enemy plane came on, attempting to crash into the ship.

The Japanese bore in through the flak-peppered skies. His wing struck the forward port 40-millimeter gun, and the main body of the plane spun into the gig rigged outboard, carried away a life raft, and then smashed a 26-foot (7.9 m) motor whaleboat before falling into the sea. Providentially, the enemy did not explode; the ship did, however, receive a shower of debris and gasoline. That had been the ship's second narrow escape. Only six days previously, on 22 April, Wadsworth's gunners had shot down a kamikaze that exploded in the sea only 20 feet (6.1 m) from the ship, showering the ship with fragments. Fortunately, only minor hull damage resulted, and only one sailor was wounded.

At Hagushi anchorage on the morning of 24 June, Wadsworth, relieved of radar picket duty, put her fighter-director team ashore. Since her first arrival off Okinawa, she had sounded general quarters 203 times, detected and reported the approach of hundreds of enemy aircraft, and successfully fought off all that attacked her. Her exploits during that time earned her the Presidential Unit Citation.

Departing Okinawa on 24 June, Wadsworth anchored in San Pedro Bay, Leyte, on 27 June. She spent a fortnight in Philippine waters before getting underway with a group of heavy cruisers. The force touched at Okinawa on 16 July and then headed for the East China Sea for anti-shipping sweeps off the coast of China between the ports of Fuzhou and Wenzhou. Returning to Okinawa on 29 July, that force made a similar sweep during the first week of August.

After "V-J Day" in mid-August, Wadsworth remained in the Far Eastern area, clearing Okinawa on 12 September, bound for Nagasaki, Japan, as escort for two LSTs. Reaching that atomic bomb-devastated port two days later, Wadsworth assisted in the evacuation of Allied prisoners of war from that port. On 18 September, she received on board a total of 125 liberated men, American, British, Dutch, and Australian, and transported them to Okinawa, reaching Buckner Bay on 20 September.

Clearing Buckner Bay on 25 September, Wadsworth arrived at Sasebo, Japan, the next day. Soon thereafter, she commenced transport and occupation duties, carrying troops and escorting their vital supply ships between Sasebo, Wakayama, and Yokosuka—duties in which she remained engaged through mid-November.

Departing Sasebo on 17 November 1945, Wadsworth headed for the United States, her occupation service completed. Sailing via the Hawaiian Islands, the destroyer reached San Diego between 6 and 10 December and disembarked returning veterans at that port before she headed on for Panama. Transiting the Panama Canal soon thereafter, Wadsworth arrived at the Charleston Naval Shipyard in South Carolina two days before Christmas 1945 and reported for inactivation.

Decommissioned on 18 April 1946, Wadsworth was assigned to the Charleston Group of the Atlantic Reserve Fleet. The destroyer remained inactive until selected for transfer to the Federal Republic of Germany in 1959 under the Military Assistance Program.

=== Zerstörer 3 (D172) ===
In the summer of 1959, the German transfer crew assembled at Charleston, South Carolina, for indoctrination, while the ship herself was being prepared for turnover. On 6 October 1959, Wadsworth was turned over to the West German Bundesmarine and simultaneously commissioned in their service as Zerstörer 3 (D172). Her first commander was the former Knight's Cross of the Iron Cross recipients of the Kriegsmarine Fregattenkapitän Wilhelm Meentzen.

After her initial six-year loan period was extended, Zerstörer 3 remained with the West German navy into the 1970s. Struck from the United States Navy List on 1 October 1974, the ship was sold to the Federal Republic of Germany on that date. She remained active with the West German navy until 30 October 1980, when she was transferred to Greece.

=== Greek service ===
In the Hellenic Navy, the ship was renamed Nearchos (D65). She was stricken and scrapped in 1991.

== Honors ==
Wadsworth (DD-516) earned seven battle stars for her World War II service, and a Presidential Unit Citation (US):

"For outstanding heroism in action as a fighter direction ship on radar picket station during the Okinawa Campaign, from 17 April to 24 June 1945. A natural and frequent target for heavy Japanese aerial attack while occupying advanced and isolated stations, the U.S.S. WADSWORTH defended all efforts of enemy Kamikaze and dive-bombing planes to destroy her. Constantly vigilant and ready for battle, she sent out early air warnings, provided fighter direction and, with her own gunfire, downed six enemy planes, shared in the destruction of seven others, routed many more, rendered valiant service in preventing the Japanese from striking in force against our Naval Forces off the Okinawa Beachhead. A gallant, fighting ship, the WADSWORTH, her officers and her men withstood the stress and perils of vital Radar Picket duty, achieving a distinctive combat record which attests the teamwork, courage and skill of her entire company and enhances the finest traditions of the United States Naval Service."
