= Sigournais =

- Commune
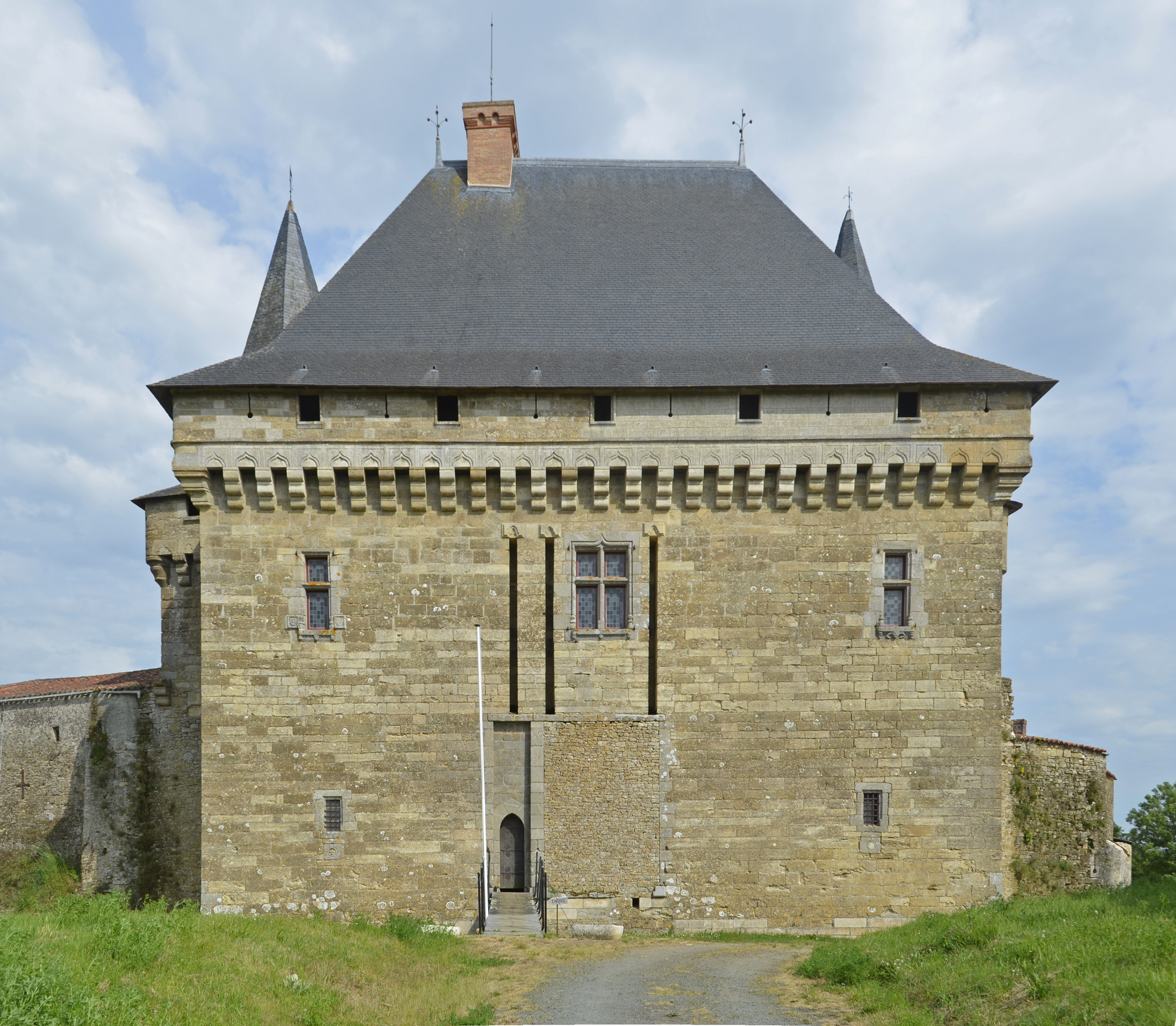
- Château de Sigournais

- Coat of arms
- Location of Sigournais
- Location within France Location within Pays de la Loire
- Coordinates: 46°42′27″N 0°59′07″W
- Country: France
- Region: Pays de la Loire
- Department: Vendée
- Arrondissement: La Roche-sur-Yon
- Canton: Chantonnay

Government
  - Mayor (2020–2026): Jean-Marcel Giraud
- Area^{1}: 18.30 km^{2} (7.07 sq mi)
- Highest elevation: 106 m (348 ft)
- Lowest elevation: 42 m (138 ft)
- Population (2023): 999
  - Density: 54.6/km^{2} (141/sq mi)
- Time zone: UTC+01:00 (CET)
  - Summer (DST): UTC+02:00 (CEST)
- INSEE/Postal code: 85282 /85110
- ^{1} French Land Register data, which excludes lakes, ponds, glaciers > 1 km^{2} (0.386 sq mi or 247 acres) and river estuaries.

Sigournais (French pronunciation: [siɡuʁnɛ]) is a commune in the Vendée department in the Pays de la Loire region in western France.

== Geography ==
The river Lay forms all of the commune's eastern border.

== See also ==
- Communes of the Vendée department
- Sigourney (disambiguation)
- L'Histoire de Famille de Sigournay
