= ORP Generał Tadeusz Kościuszko =

Frigate in the Polish Navy

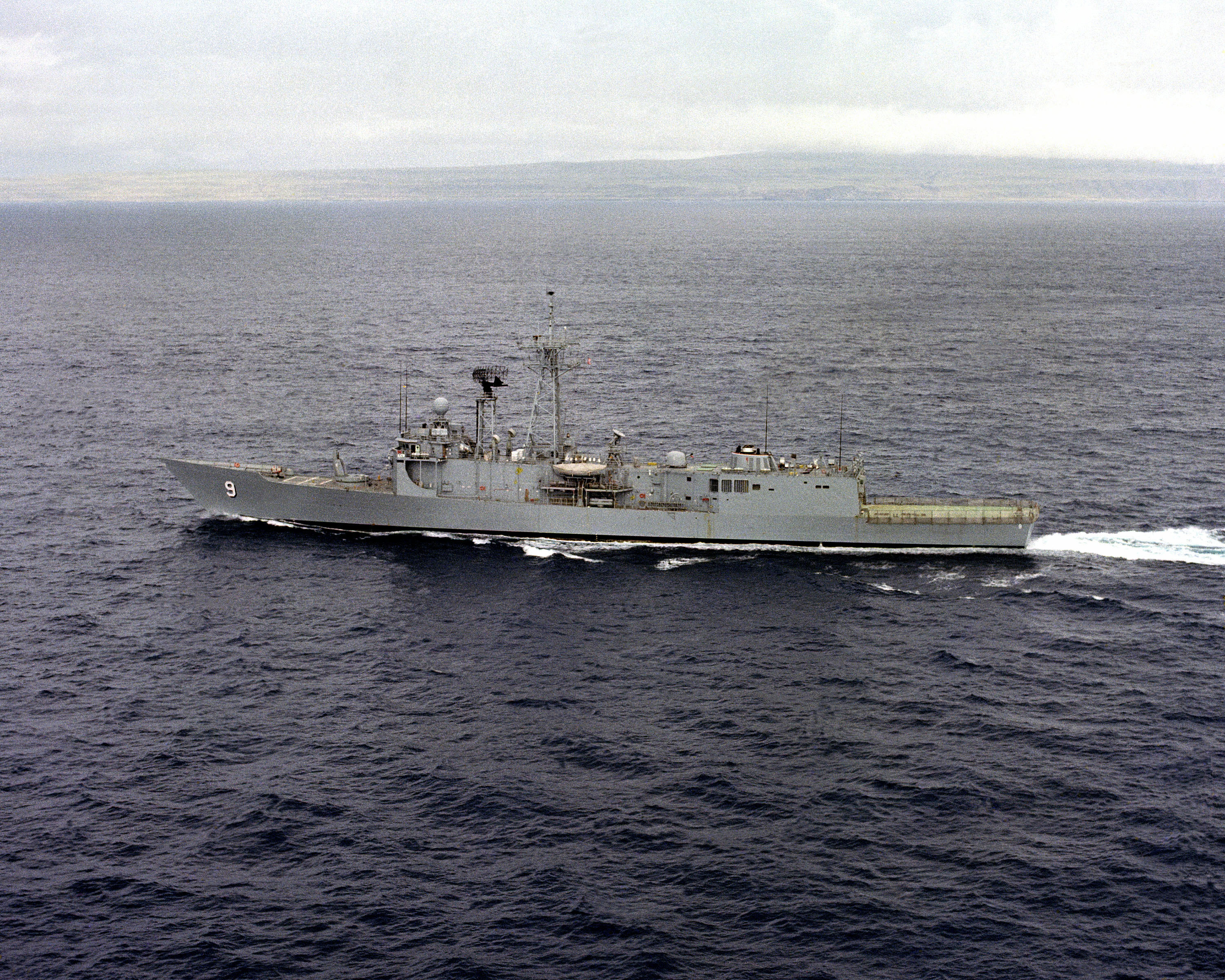
- Underway as Wadsworth, 1983

History

United States
- Name: Wadsworth
- Namesake: Commodore Alexander S. Wadsworth (1790–1851)
- Ordered: 27 February 1976
- Builder: Todd Pacific Shipyards, Los Angeles Division, San Pedro, California
- Laid down: 13 July 1977
- Launched: 29 July 1978
- Sponsored by: Mrs. Patricia P. Roberts, great-great-great-granddaughter of Commodore Alexander S. Wadsworth
- Commissioned: 2 April 1980
- Decommissioned: 28 June 2002
- Stricken: 23 July 2002
- Home port: San Diego, California (former)
- Identification: Hull symbol:FFG-9; Code letters:NASW
- Motto: "For One's Country"
- Fate: Transferred to Poland
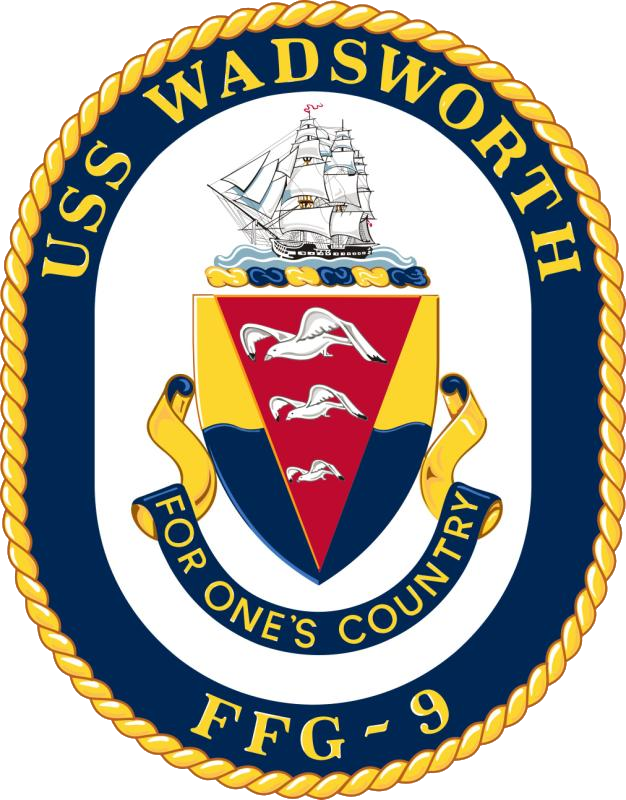
- Badge

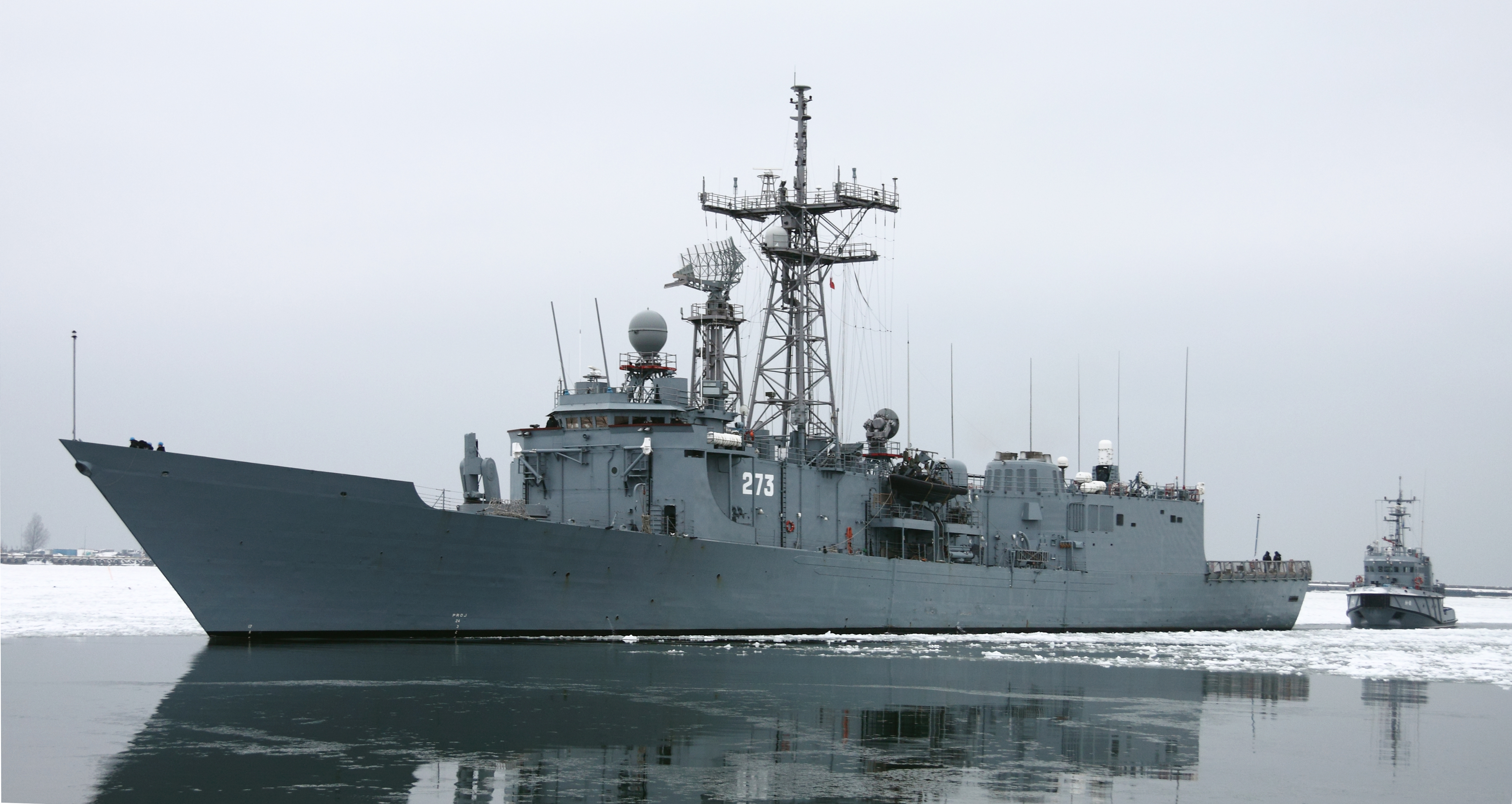
- As Generał Tadeusz Kościuszko, 2012

Poland
- Name: Generał Tadeusz Kościuszko
- Namesake: Tadeusz Kościuszko
- Commissioned: 28 June 2002
- Home port: Oksywie, Gdynia
- Identification: Pennant number: 273; MMSI number: 261283000; Callsign: SNWS
- Status: In active service

General characteristics
- Class & type: Oliver Hazard Perry-class frigate
- Displacement: 4,100 long tons (4,200 t), full load
- Length: 445 feet (136 m), overall
- Beam: 45 feet (14 m)
- Draft: 22 feet (6.7 m)
- Propulsion: 2 × General Electric LM2500-30 gas turbines generating 41,000 shp (31 MW) through a single shaft and variable pitch propeller; 2 × Auxiliary Propulsion Units, 350 hp (260 kW) retractable electric azimuth thrusters for maneuvering and docking.
- Speed: over 29 knots (54 km/h)
- Range: 5,000 nautical miles at 18 knots (9,300 km at 33 km/h)
- Complement: 15 officers and 190 enlisted, plus SH-60 LAMPS detachment of roughly six officer pilots and 15 enlisted maintainers (US Service)
- Sensors & processing systems: AN/SPS-49 air-search radar; AN/SPS-55 surface-search radar; CAS and STIR fire-control radar; AN/SQS-56 sonar.
- Electronic warfare & decoys: AN/SLQ-32
- Armament: As built: 1 × OTO Melara Mk 75 76 mm/62 caliber naval gun; 2 × Mk 32 triple-tube (324 mm) launchers for Mark 46 torpedoes; 1 × Vulcan Phalanx CIWS; 4 × .50-cal (12.7 mm) machine guns.; 1 × Mk 13 Mod 4 single-arm launcher for Harpoon anti-ship missiles and SM-1MR Standard anti-ship/air missiles (40 round magazine); Note: As of 2004, Mk 13 systems removed from all active US vessels of this class.
- Aircraft carried: US Service: 1 to 2 × SH-2F/G LAMPS I helicopter; Polish Service: 1x SH-2G Super Seasprite helicopter (removed 07.11.2025)

ORP Generał Tadeusz Kościuszko, formerly USS Wadsworth (FFG-9), is one of two Oliver Hazard Perry-class guided-missile frigates in the Polish Navy. She is the 2nd "short-hull" ship to be built and 3rd overall.

She is named after Tadeusz Kościuszko, an American Revolutionary War hero as well as a hero of Poland's struggle for independence. In US Navy service she was named after Commodore Alexander S. Wadsworth.

Originally commissioned in 1980, she served in the US Navy until 2002, when she was decommissioned and immediately turned over to the Polish Navy.

Generał Tadeusz Kościuszko has participated in numerous NATO exercises in the Baltic Sea.

== History ==
Ordered from Todd Pacific Shipyards, Los Angeles Division, San Pedro, California on 27 February 1976 as part of the FY75 program, Wadsworth, originally classified PF-111, was laid down on 13 July 1977, launched on 29 July 1978, and commissioned on 28 February 1980. Wadsworth was sponsored by Mrs. Patricia P. Roberts, the great-great-great-granddaughter of Commodore Alexander S. Wadsworth.

Wadsworth portrayed USS Reuben James (FFG-57) in the 1990 film The Hunt for Red October along with USS Gary (FFG-51).

The ship's motto in American service was "For One's Country" and originates from the words of Captain Isaac Hull, Commanding Officer of USS Constitution before her August 1812 battle with HMS Guerriere. Hull said, "Men, now do your duty. Your officers cannot have entire command over you now. Each man must do all in his power for his country.".

Wadsworth and her crew received Battle Effectiveness Awards for operations in 1993, 1998 and 2001.

Decommissioned on 28 June 2002, Wadsworth was handed over to Poland the same day as part of the Foreign Military Sales program and commissioned under her current name. She was formally stricken from the Navy list on 23 July 2002.

== See also ==
- SS Kościuszko, Polish ocean liner also named after Tadeusz Kościuszko

== Bibliography ==
- Saunders, Stephen, ed. (2004). Jane's Fighting Ships 2004–2005. Coulsdon, UK: Jane's Information Group. ISBN 0-7106-2623-1.
