= Wilhelm Meentzen =

- Born: 19 March 1915
- Died: 8 May 2001 (aged 86)
- Military career
- Allegiance: Nazi Germany; West Germany
- Branch: Kriegsmarine; German Navy
- Service years: 1934–45; 1956–74
- Rank: Vizeadmiral
- Commands: Zerstörer 3 (D172)
- Conflicts: World War II
- Awards: Knight's Cross of the Iron Cross

Wilhelm Meentzen (19 March 1915 – 8 May 2001) was a German admiral in the Bundeswehr. He commanded the destroyer Zerstörer 3 (D172), formerly USS Wadsworth (DD-516), from October 1959 until January 1961. During World War II, Meentzen commanded Kriegsmarine torpedo boats and received the Knight's Cross of the Iron Cross of Nazi Germany.

== Awards and decorations ==
- Spanish Cross in Bronze with Swords (6 June 1939)
- Iron Cross (1939) 2nd Class (23 December 1939) & 1st Class (21 November 1940)
- German Cross in Gold on 5 May 1944 as Kapitänleutnant on Torpedoboot T-24/4. Torpedoboots-Flottille
- Knight's Cross of the Iron Cross on 30 October 1944 as Kapitänleutnant and commander of Torpedoboot T-24
- Order of Merit of the Federal Republic of Germany (25 May 1973)
