= USS Sigourney (DD-81) =

Wickes-class destroyer

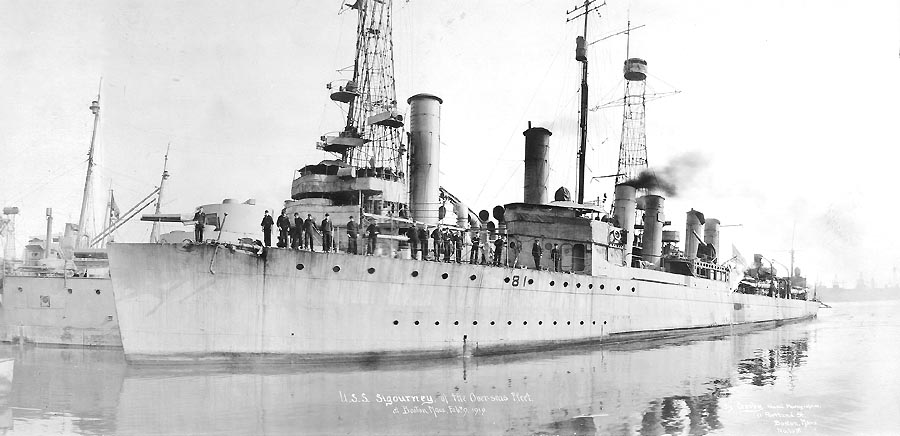
- USS Sigourney (DD-81)

History

United States
- Name: Sigourney
- Namesake: James Butler Sigourney
- Builder: Fore River Shipyard, Quincy, Massachusetts
- Laid down: 25 August 1917
- Launched: 16 December 1917
- Commissioned: 15 May 1918
- Decommissioned: 26 June 1922
- Recommissioned: 23 August 1940
- Decommissioned: 26 November 1940
- Stricken: 8 January 1941
- Fate: Transferred to United Kingdom 26 November 1940

United Kingdom
- Name: HMS Newport
- Acquired: 26 November 1940 (from U.S. Navy)
- Commissioned: 5 December 1940
- Identification: Pennant number: G54
- Fate: Transferred to Norway March 1941
- Acquired: June 1942 (from Norway)
- Decommissioned: January 1945
- Fate: Scrapped 18 February 1947

Norway
- Name: HNoMS Newport
- Namesake: Previous name retained
- Acquired: March 1941 (from Royal Navy)
- Identification: Pennant number: G54
- Fate: Transferred to United Kingdom June 1942

General characteristics
- Class & type: Wickes-class destroyer
- Displacement: 1,191 tons
- Length: 314 ft 4 1/2 in (95.822 m)
- Beam: 30 ft 4 1/4 in (9.252 m)
- Draft: 9 ft 2 in (2.79 m)
- Speed: 35 knots (65 km/h)
- Complement: 122 officers and enlisted
- Armament: 4 x 4 in (102 mm)/50 caliber guns; 1 x 3 in (76 mm)/23 caliber AA gun; 12 x 21 inch (533 mm) torpedo tubes

USS Sigourney (DD–81) was a Wickes-class destroyer in the United States Navy during World War I. She was the first ship named for James Butler Sigourney.

== Construction and commissioning ==
Sigourney was laid down on 25 August 1917 by the Fore River Shipbuilding Company, Quincy, Massachusetts, launched on 16 December 1917, sponsored by Mrs. Granville W. Johnson, and commissioned on 15 May 1918.

== Service history ==
=== United States Navy ===
On 27 May, Sigourney sailed from the United States escorting a troopship to France. On arrival at Brest, she was assigned to Commander Naval Forces, France; and, for the remainder of World War I, she escorted convoys through the submarine danger zone extending approximately 500 miles west of Brest. During most of her convoys, Sigourney was the flagship of the screen commander but did not herself have any confirmed submarine contacts.

After the Armistice with Germany on 11 November, she performed miscellaneous duties in European waters, including service in early December as flagship of the four-destroyer screen that escorted George Washington on the middle part of that transport's voyage to carry President Woodrow Wilson from the United States to France for the Versailles Peace Conference. Sigourney sailed from Brest for the United States on 26 December 1918 and arrived at Boston on 8 January 1919. After overhaul at Boston and summer training at Newport, Sigourney was placed in reserve status at Philadelphia on 1 November 1919, and decommissioned there on 26 June 1922.

=== Royal Navy and Royal Norwegian Navy ===
Sigourney was recommissioned at Philadelphia on 23 August 1940 and sailed to Halifax, Nova Scotia. There, on 26 November, she was decommissioned and turned over to a Canadian care-and-maintenance party. Commissioned by the British as HMS Newport on 5 December, she was transferred as part of the Destroyers for Bases Agreement. Sigourney was struck from the Navy list on 8 January 1941.

After engine repairs in England, as HNoMS Newport, she operated on convoy duty as a unit of the exiled Royal Norwegian Navy from March 1941 to June 1942. She then reverted to the British, and after repairs, served as an aircraft target ship from June 1943 until placed in reserve in January 1945. Newport was scrapped at Granton, Scotland, on 18 February 1947.
