= Cinestudio =

Theater in Hartford, Connecticut, US

Coordinates: 41.7489°N 72.693°W

Cinestudio is an independent film theater located on the campus of Trinity College in Hartford, Connecticut. The theater is a single-screen venue with a seating capacity of approximately 485, a classic McKim, Mead & White design from 1935. Regionally, it is known for its large screen, 70 mm film projection capability, Ultra High Definition 4K Digital Cinema and classic movie palace atmosphere. The Dolby/Altec sound system is legendary. Cinestudio features a spectacular gold Austrian screen curtain that rises at every show, real balcony seating, and the gold lion courant insignia.

Cinestudio Theater

== History ==
Cinestudio was founded in 1970, by a group of students at Trinity College. The students converted a large lecture hall in the college's Clement Chemistry Building on the Long Walk quad into a recreation of a 1930s film house. The theater was created as a cooperative, with students overseeing all aspects of the theater's operation. Cinestudio made its mark early by showing controversial films and debuting future cult classics, including The Rocky Horror Picture Show, Harold and Maude and Pink Flamingos.

Cinestudio has continued largely as a cooperative operation. Two founding members, James Hanley and Peter McMorris, have guided the theater since its inception and now manage its day-to-day operation. A staff of approximately 50 student and community volunteers run showings seven days a week.

In 2002, Cinestudio incorporated as a 501(c)(3) not-for-profit arts organization. The theater now is independent of Trinity College, although it still occupies space in the college's chemistry building.

In 2007, the theater's ticket booth was renamed the Fred Pfeil Memorial Ticket Booth in honor of late Trinity College professor and long-time Cinestudio volunteer and board member, Fred Pfeil.

== Films ==
Cinestudio screens a variety of second-run, independent, and classic films. Program booking is an open process in which patron participation in the film selection process is welcomed. Annually, Cinestudio hosts several film festivals, including The Connecticut Gay & Lesbian Film Festival, April in Paris, and Trinity Film Festival, the international student film festival.
