= Charles Sigourney =

Businessman and husband of famous poet

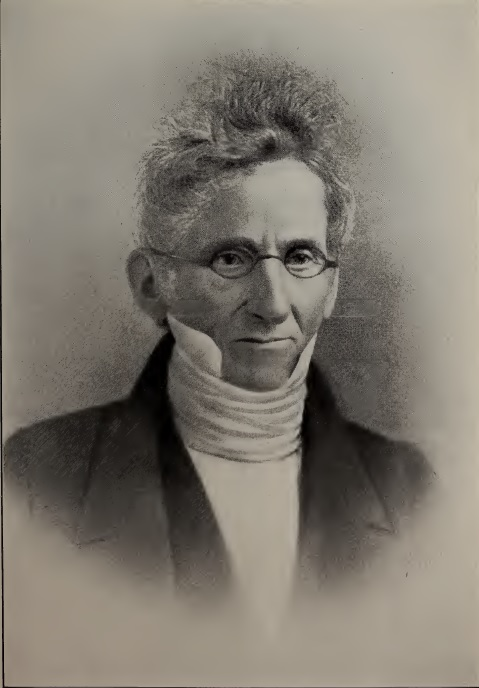
- Sigourney in the 1840s
- Born: July 21, 1778
- Died: December 30, 1854 (aged 76)
- Burial place: Hartford, Connecticut

Charles Sigourney (July 21, 1778 – December 30, 1854) was an American businessman, banker, philanthropist, and founding trustee of Washington (later Trinity) College in Hartford, Connecticut. In addition to his myriad activities on behalf of the Episcopal Church in Connecticut, Sigourney is notable for his marriage to American poet Lydia Huntley Sigourney.

== Biography ==
=== Early life ===
Charles Sigourney was born in Boston, Massachusetts in 1778 to Charles Sigourney, a Boston merchant with “distinguished early-American forbears” of French Huguenot stock. Little is known about his mother, but the Sigourney entry in the 1790 Census indicated that four women lived in the household. After an elite education, including a short stint at an art school in Hamstead, England, Sigourney became apprentice to his father at the age of thirteen and was sent to Hartford in 1799 to make a career in the hardware business.

=== Involvement in Episcopal Church and Founding of Washington College ===
From his early days in Hartford, Sigourney was heavily involved in the Episcopal Church in Connecticut. From 1803 to 1817, he served as clerk of the newly incorporated Christ Church Cathedral in Hartford, later becoming a vestryman and warden. Sigourney was integral in successfully petitioning the state legislature for permission to form the Phoenix National Bank in 1814, which was locally known as the “Episcopal Bank.” He would serve as the bank's second president from 1822 to 1837, when a public quarrel between Sigourney and cashier George Beach led to his abrupt resignation. Sigourney accused Beach of various conflicts of interest tied to the latter's involvement in Western land speculation and questionable friendships with untrustworthy individuals. An internal investigation made by the bank exonerated Beach and admonished both men.

Sigourney was also a key player in establishing an Episcopal university in Connecticut in the early decades of the 19th century. When Washington (later Trinity) College was eventually approved by the state legislature in 1823, Sigourney was elected Secretary of the Board of Trustees, a post he would hold until at least the late 1840s. In this capacity, Sigourney carried on correspondence with early American statesmen and benefactors such as James Madison and Thomas Jefferson, with whom he and his wife dined at Monticello in May 1825.

== Personal life ==
Charles Sigourney and his first wife, Jane Carter Sigourney had three children, Charles Henry, Elizabeth Carter, and Jane Carter before her death in 1818. Lydia Sigourney (née Huntley) knew the couple and wrote an elegy for the late Jane upon her death.

=== Marriage to Lydia Huntley Sigourney ===
Charles Sigourney married Lydia Huntley on June 16, 1819. Scholars have long noted the conflict between their social compatibility and Charles's insistence that female authorship was "unfeminine, inappropriate for a married woman and mother, likely to distract [Lydia] from the domestic supervision that helped sustain his own career, and liable to public controversy." Although initially supportive of her career, even providing scholarly notes to her Traits of the Aborigines of America: A Poem (1822), extant drafts of a letter he wrote to Lydia in October 1827 suggest he had reached his boiling point. While careful not to accuse Lydia of sexual impropriety, Charles asserts the impropriety of female authorship when lauded above the duties of wife and mother. While writing might be a reasonable amateur pastime, he goes on to say, "I object to the excess, & the abuse of this talent, the consequent immoderate desire of constantly appearing before the publick, & the immoderate desire of notoriety … which amounts … to a mental disease."

=== Anne Prince ===
The Sigourney household employed a black domestic worker, Anne Prince (born 1794) from 1836 to at least 1850. While little of her life is known, 1850 Census records indicate that she was born in New York in 1794. Gradual emancipation laws were not passed in New York until 1799, promising freedom to young women by their 25th birthday. This means that Prince was likely born into slavery, a fact that Lydia Sigourney confirms in her posthumously published Letters of Life. A paystub, handwritten by Sigourney, establishes the earliest known date of her employment with the Sigourney family and describes services rendered between 25 December 1836 to 25 December 1837, with deductions made for a two-week absence in September 1837.
