= Trinity College (Connecticut) =

Private college in Hartford, Connecticut, US

- Former name: Washington College (1823–1845)
- Motto: Pro Ecclesia Et Patria (Latin)
- Motto in English: For Church and Country
- Type: Private liberal arts college
- Established: May 1823; 203 years ago
- Accreditation: NECHE
- Academic affiliations: Annapolis Group; CIC; CLAC; COFHE; Oberlin Group; Space-grant
- Endowment: $893.2 million (2025)
- President: Daniel G. Lugo
- Faculty: 230 full-time and 45 part-time (spring 2022)
- Students: 2,241 (spring 2022)
- Undergraduates: 2,200 (spring 2022)
- Postgraduates: 41 (spring 2021)
- Location: Hartford, Connecticut, U.S. 41.747°N 72.690°W
- Campus: Urban, 100 acres (40 ha)
- Colors: Blue and gold
- Nickname: Bantams
- Sporting affiliations: NCAA Division III – NESCAC
- Mascot: Bantam
- Website: trincoll.edu

Trinity College is a private liberal arts college in Hartford, Connecticut, United States. Founded as Washington College in 1823, it is the second-oldest college in the state of Connecticut (after Yale University). Coeducational since 1969, the college enrolls 2,235 students. Trinity offers 41 majors and 28 interdisciplinary minors. The college is a member of the New England Small College Athletic Conference (NESCAC).

== History ==
=== 19th century ===
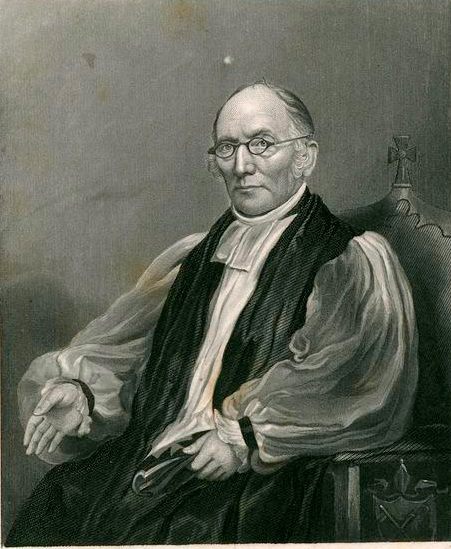
Trinity College founder Thomas Church Brownell

Bishop Thomas Brownell opened "Washington College" in 1824 to nine male students and the vigorous protest of Yale alumni. A 14-acre site was chosen, at the time about a half-mile from the city of Hartford. The banker Charles Sigourney was instrumental in helping to establish the college, and was Secretary of the Board of Trustees for many years, corresponding with notable figures such as Thomas Jefferson on matters related to the college.

The college was renamed "Trinity College" in 1845; the original campus consisted of two Greek Revival buildings. One of the Greek Revival buildings housed a chapel, library, and lecture rooms. The other was a dormitory for the male students.

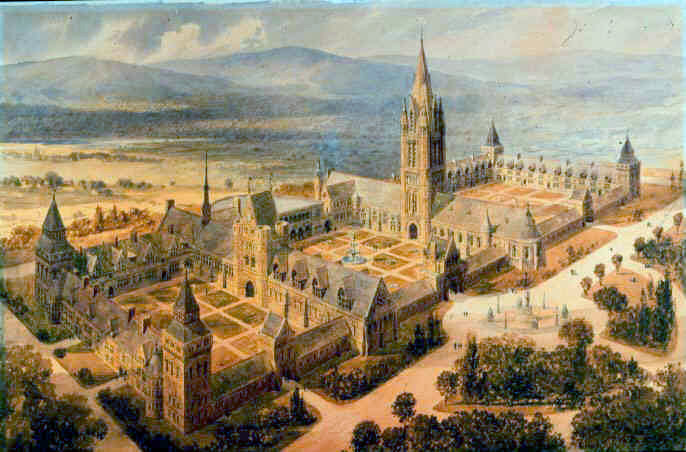
William Burges's original plan for the Trinity College campus

In 1872, Trinity College was persuaded by the state to move from its downtown "College Hill" location (now Capitol Hill, site of the state capitol building) to its current 100-acre (40 ha) campus a mile southwest. Although the college sold its land overlooking the Park River and Bushnell Park in 1872, it did not complete its move to its Gallows Hill campus until 1878. The original plans for the Gallows Hill site were drawn by the noted Victorian architect William Burges but were too ambitious and too expensive to be fully realized. Only one section of the proposed campus plan, the Long Walk, was completed.

By 1889, the library contained 30,000 volumes, and the school had graduated over 900 students. Enrollment reached 122 in 1892.

=== 20th century ===
President Remsen Ogilby (1920–1943) enlarged the campus, and more than doubled the endowment. The faculty grew from 25 to 62, and the student body from 167 to 530 men. Under President Keith Funston (1943–1951), returning veterans expanded the enrollment to 900.

In 1962, Connecticut Public Television (CPTV) began its first broadcasts in the Trinity College Public Library, and later in Boardman Hall, a science building on campus.

In 1968, the trustees voted to withdraw from the Association of Episcopal Colleges. Also in 1968, the trustees of Trinity College voted to make a commitment to enroll more minority students, providing financial aid as needed. This decision was preceded by a siege of the administrative offices in the Downes and Williams Memorial buildings during which Trinity students would not allow the president or trustees to leave until they agreed to the resolution.

Under the leadership of president Theodore D. Lockwood and Dean of Faculty Robert Works Fuller, the college entered on a period of reform. In 1969, Trinity College became coeducational and admitted its first female students, as transfers from Vassar College and Smith College.

=== 21st century ===
Joanne Berger-Sweeney was inaugurated as the 22nd president of Trinity College in 2014. She was the first African-American and the first woman to serve in the position. She was succeeded by Daniel G. Lugo in 2025.

== Academics ==
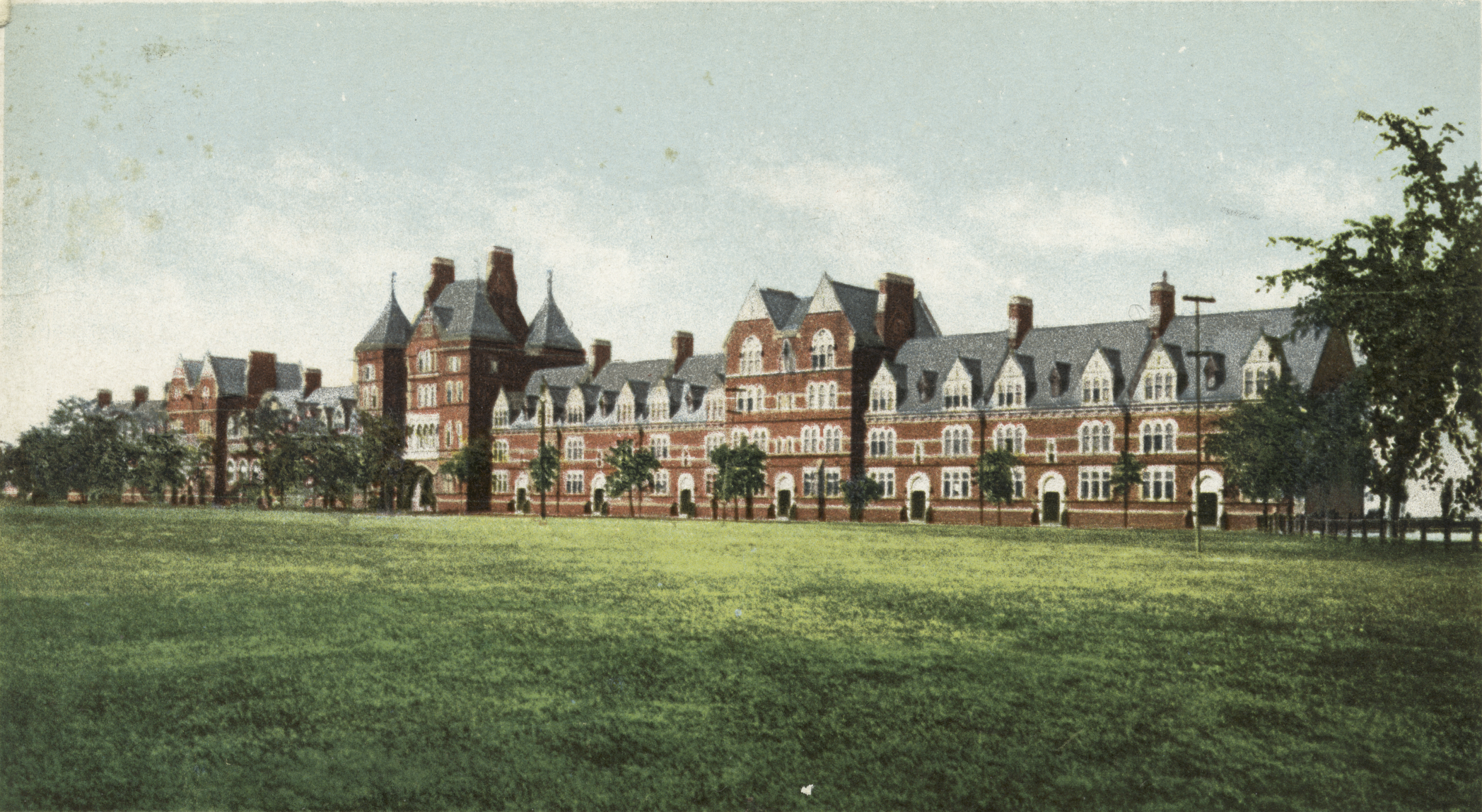
Trinity College, showing the Long Walk and three attached buildings: Northam (center), Jarvis (right), Seabury (left)

Trinity offers undergraduate degrees in 41 majors with options of 28 minors and a self-designed major, and Masters of Arts in a few subjects. Trinity is part of a small group of liberal arts schools that offer degrees in engineering. Trinity has a student-to-faculty ratio of 9:1. Its most popular undergraduate majors, by number out of 517 graduates in 2022, were:

- Political Science and Government (80)
- Economics (64)
- Psychology (41)
- Econometrics and Quantitative Economics (38)
- Engineering (28)
- Neuroscience (24)
- Biology/Biological Sciences (23)

=== Trinity College, Rome Campus ===
Trinity College, Rome Campus (TCRC), is a study abroad campus of Trinity College. It was established in 1970 and is in a residential area of Rome on the Aventine Hill close to the Basilica of Santa Sabina within the precincts of a convent run by an order of nuns.

=== Admissions ===
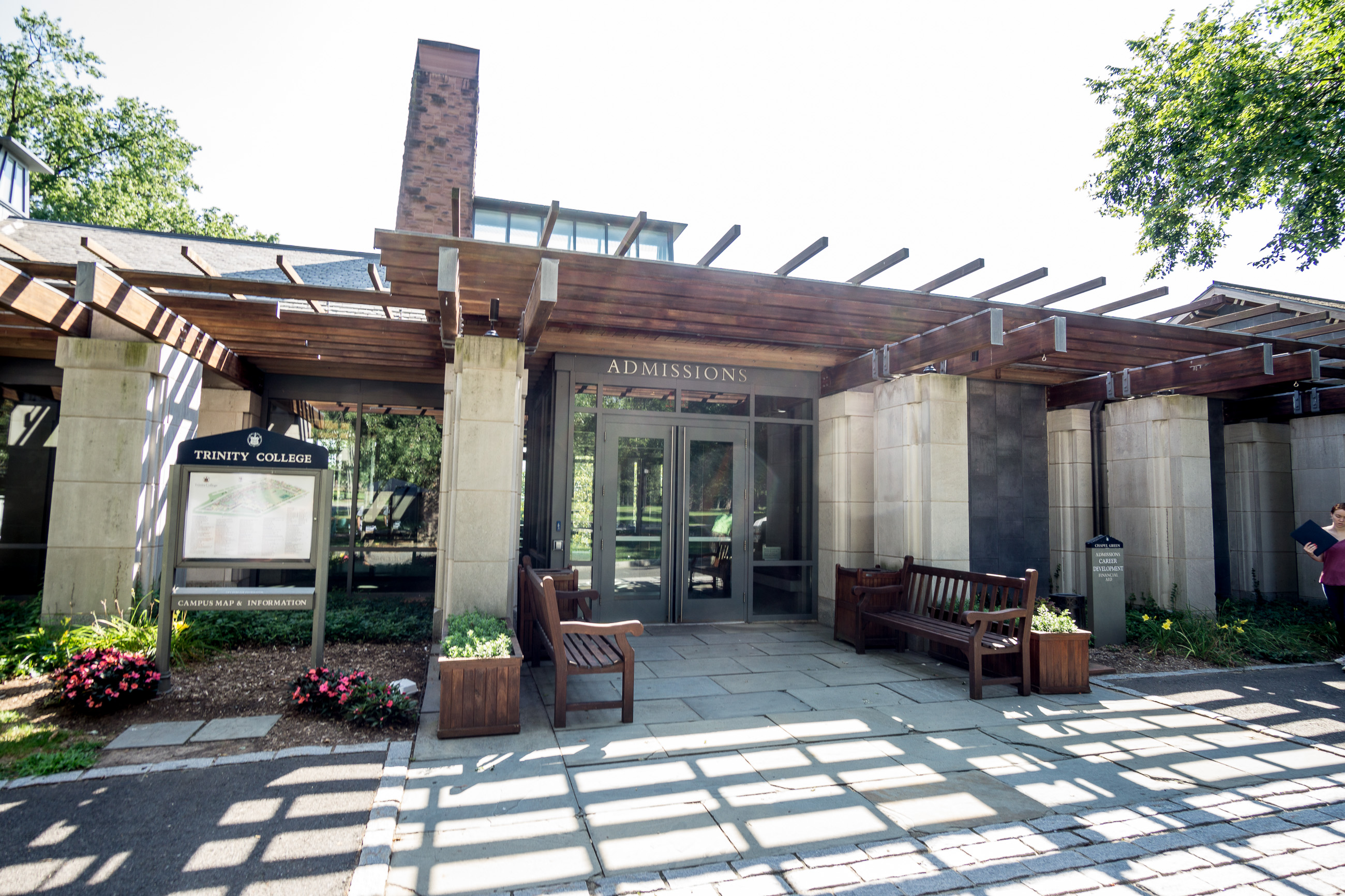
Admissions building

The 2020 annual ranking by U.S. News & World Report categorizes Trinity as "more selective".

For the Class of 2028 (enrolling fall 2024), Trinity received 7,592 applications, accepted 29%, and ultimately enrolled 547 students.

As of fall 2015, Trinity College did not require the SAT or ACT for students applying for admission. Of the 31% of enrolled freshmen submitting SAT scores, the middle 50% range was 630–710 for evidence-based reading and writing, and 670–750 for math, while of the 23% of enrolled freshmen submitting ACT results, the middle 50% range for the composite score was 29–32.

=== Rankings and reputation ===
Academic rankings

Liberal arts
- U.S. News & World Report: 36
- Washington Monthly: 26

National
- Forbes: 71
- WSJ/College Pulse: 104

Forbes magazine ranked Trinity College 17th amongst all liberal arts universities and 71st amongst all colleges and universities on its 2024-25 list. In 2024, Washington Monthly ranked Trinity College 26th among 194 liberal arts colleges in the U.S. based on its contribution to the public good, as measured by social mobility, research, and promoting public service. U.S. News & World Report ranked Trinity tied for 36th in its 2025 ranking of best national liberal arts colleges in the United States. It was also ranked 27th for best value school. However, these US News rankings likely reflect that Trinity joined the "Annapolis Group" in August 2007, an organization of more than 100 of the nation's liberal arts schools, in refusing to participate in the magazine's rankings. Trinity College is accredited by the New England Commission of Higher Education.

In 2016, authors Howard and Matthew Greene continued to include Trinity in the third edition of Hidden Ivies: 63 Top Colleges that Rival the Ivy League. The Princeton Review has given Trinity a 93 (out of 99) for selectivity and in 2017 named Trinity as a best value college. In 2022, Money.com magazine ranked Trinity College 55th among all colleges and universities in the nation.

== Student life ==
=== Mascot ===
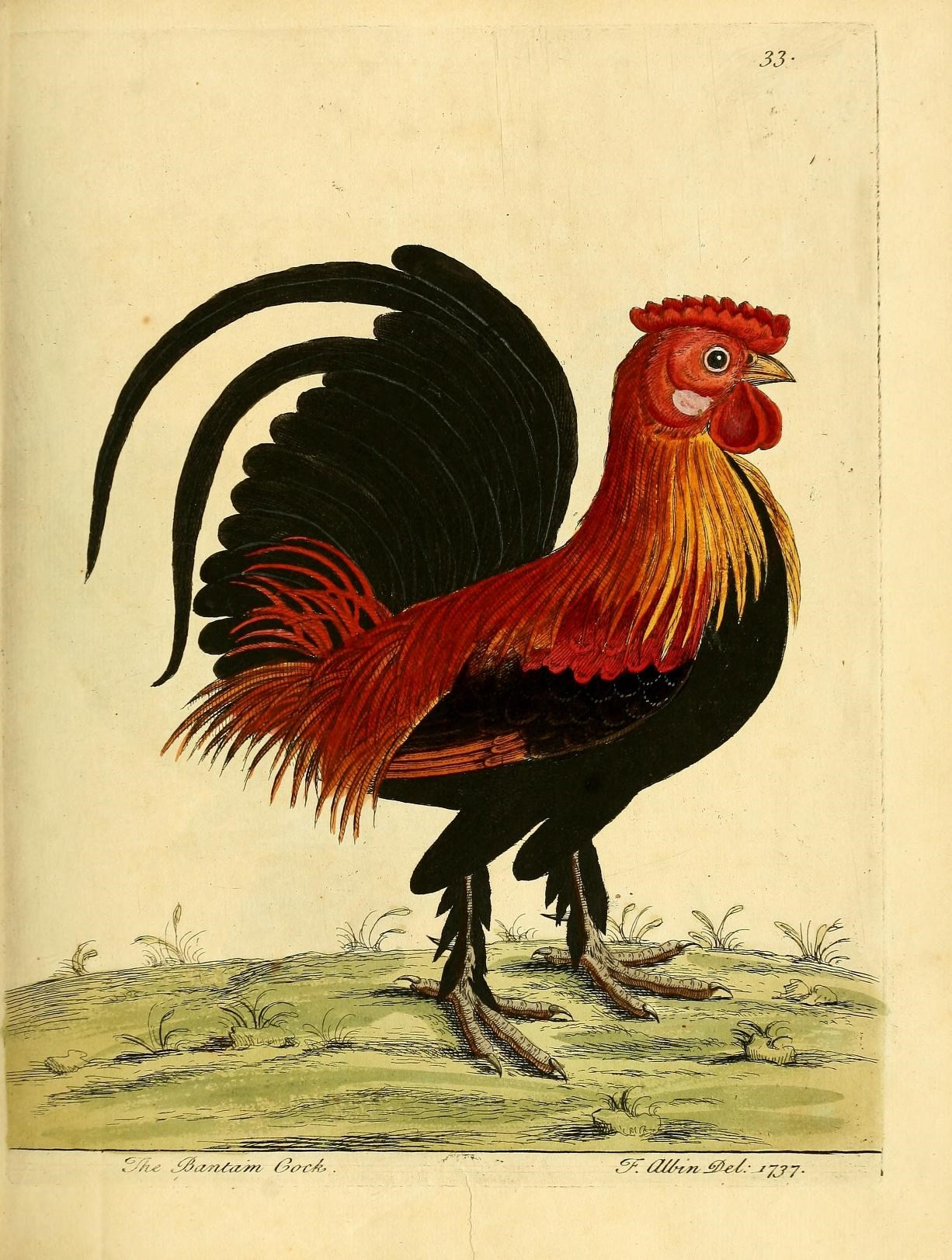
Illustration of a bantam, Trinity's mascot

Trinity's mascot, the bantam, was conceived by Joseph Buffington, class of 1875, who was a federal judge and trustee of the college.

=== Student publication ===
The Trinity Tripod, founded in 1904, is Trinity College's student newspaper.

=== Fraternities and sororities ===
According to the college, 18% of the student body are affiliated with a Greek organization.

In 2012, then-president James F. Jones proposed a social policy for Trinity College which made a commitment, among other things, to require all sororities and fraternities to achieve gender parity within two years or face closure. Trinity College's co-ed mandate for fraternities and sororities was withdrawn in September 2015 and replaced with the "Campaign for Community" effort to establish more inclusive social traditions on campus.

== Hartford campus ==
=== Long Walk buildings ===
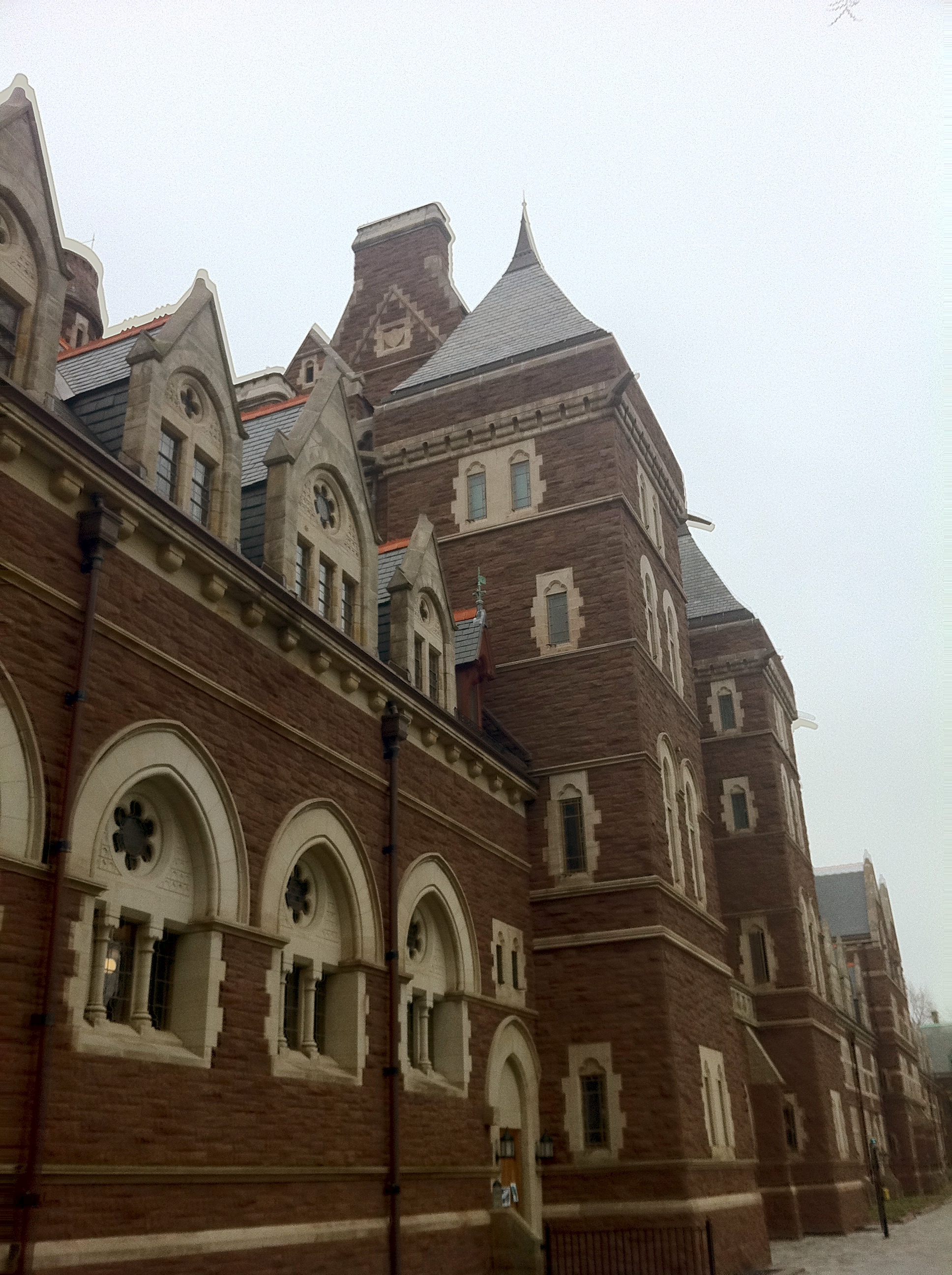
Seabury Hall, part of a $32.9 million renovation and restoration of the Long Walk buildings

The first buildings completed on the current campus were Seabury and Jarvis halls in 1878. Together with Northam Towers, these make up what is known as the "Long Walk".

These buildings are an early example of Collegiate Gothic architecture in the United States, built to plans drawn up by William Burges, with F.H. Kimball as supervising architect. The Long Walk has been expanded and is connected with several other buildings.

On the northernmost end there is the chapel, whose western side is connected to the Downes and Williams Memorial building. Heading south, the next building is Jarvis Hall, named after Abraham Jarvis. Jarvis becomes Northam Towers heading south, then Seabury Hall. Seabury Hall, named for Samuel Seabury, is connected to Hamlin Hall. To Hamlin's east is Cook, then Goodwin and then Woodward.

The dormitories on the Long Walk end there, and the terminal building on the south end of the long walk is Clement/Cinestudio. Clement is the chemistry building; Cinestudio a student run movie theater. If one travels to the south of Hamlin there will be Mather Hall and the Dean of Students Office.

=== Main quadrangle ===
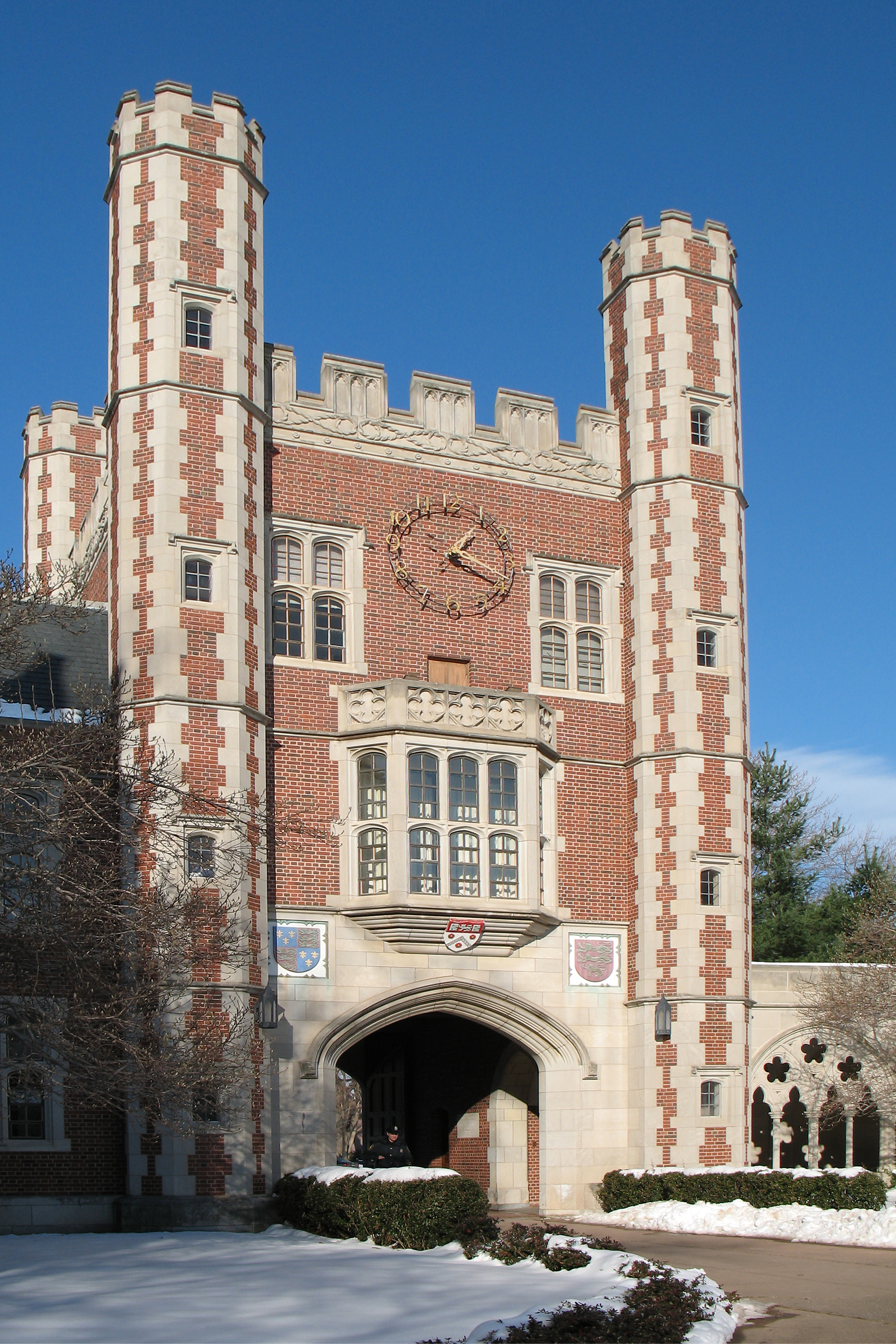
The Downes Memorial clock tower

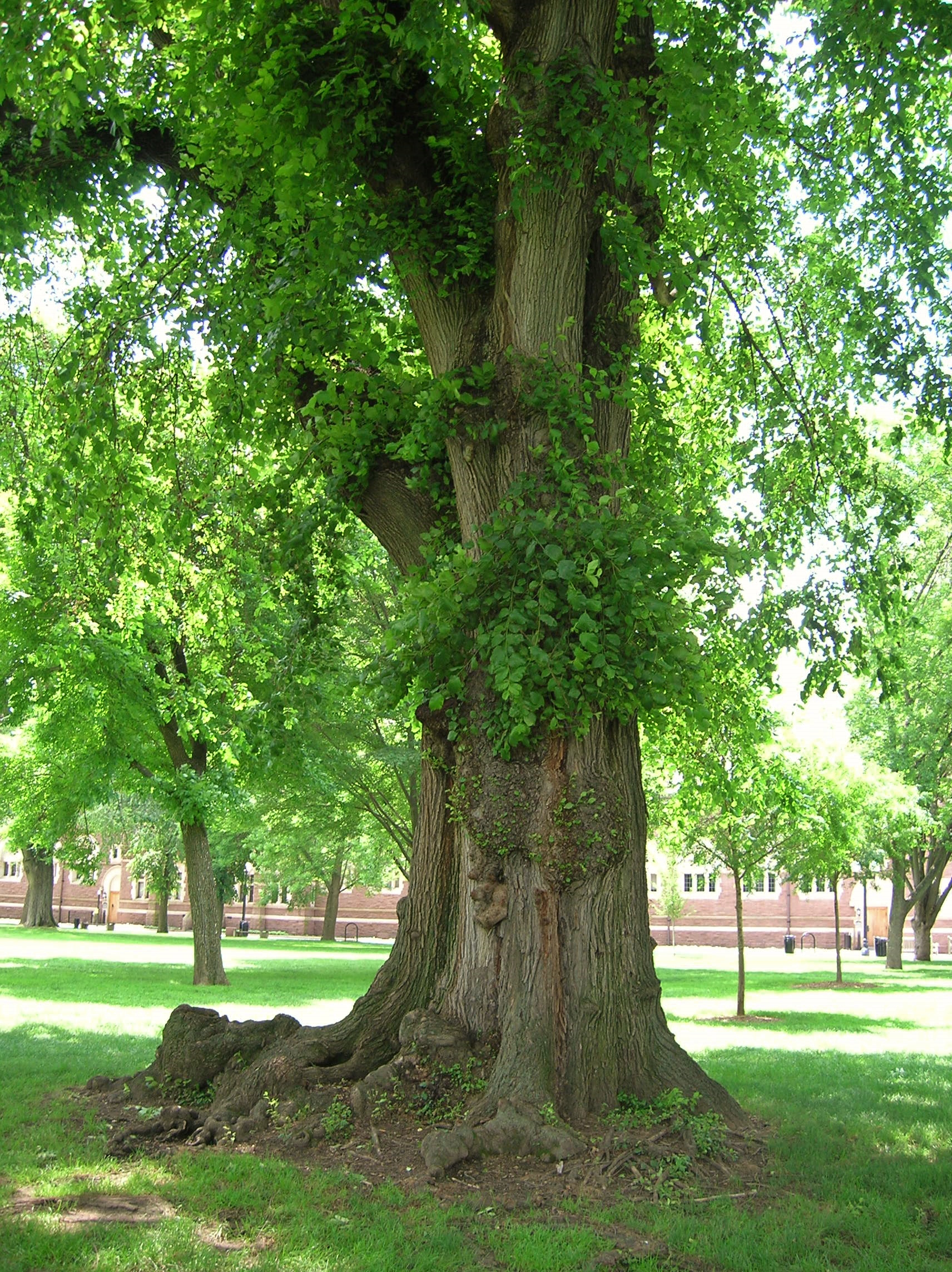
An English elm tree on Trinity Quad

Trinity's campus features a central green known as the Main Quad, designed by Frederick Law Olmsted. The large expanse of grass is bound on the west by the Long Walk, on the east by the Lower Long Walk, on the north by the chapel, and on the south by the Cook and Goodwin-Woodward dormitories. Trinity's green is notable for its unusually large, rectangular size, running the entire length of the Long Walk and with no walkways traversing it. Trees on the Quad have been planted in a 'T' configuration (for Trinity) with the letter's base at the statue of Bishop Brownell (built 1867). and its top running the length of the Long Walk.

==== Film ====
Cinestudio is an art cinema with 1930s-style design. An article in the Hartford Advocate described this non-profit organization, which depends solely on grants and the efforts of volunteer workers who are paid in free movies.

==== Music ====
Trinity College hosts the Albert Schweitzer Organ Festival, one of the top competitions for young organists in North America. The festival features performances on the chapel organ, which was designed by Charles Nazarian, a college alumnus and pipe organ designer, in consultation with Clarence Watters, who was the chapel organist and head of the college's music department from 1932 to 1967. The organ incorporates pipes from the chapel’s original 1932 Aeolian-Skinner organ and was built in 1971 by Austin Organs of Hartford.

The Chapel Singers perform concerts on campus as well as on domestic and international tours. Trinity also hosts the annual Trinity International Hip Hop Festival. The festival was founded in 2006 with the goal of unifying Trinity with the city of Hartford.

Since 2006, Trinity's WRTC FM radio station has broadcast the Trinity Samba Fest from the Hartford waterfront featuring regional and international talent.

Student body composition as of May 2, 2022
Race and ethnicity	Total
White	61%
Foreign national	14%
Hispanic	9%
Black	6%
Asian	4%
Other (Note: Other consists of Multiracial Americans & those who prefer to not say.)	4%
Economic diversity
Low-income (Note: The percentage of students who received an income-based federal Pell grant intended for low-income students.)	13%
Affluent (Note: The percentage of students who are a part of the American middle class at the bare minimum.)	87%

== Athletics ==
Trinity's athletic teams teams are named the Bantams. They compete in the New England Small College Athletic Conference of the National Collegiate Athletic Association (NCAA) Division III. The College offers 27 varsity teams, plus club sports, intramural sports.

== Notable alumni ==
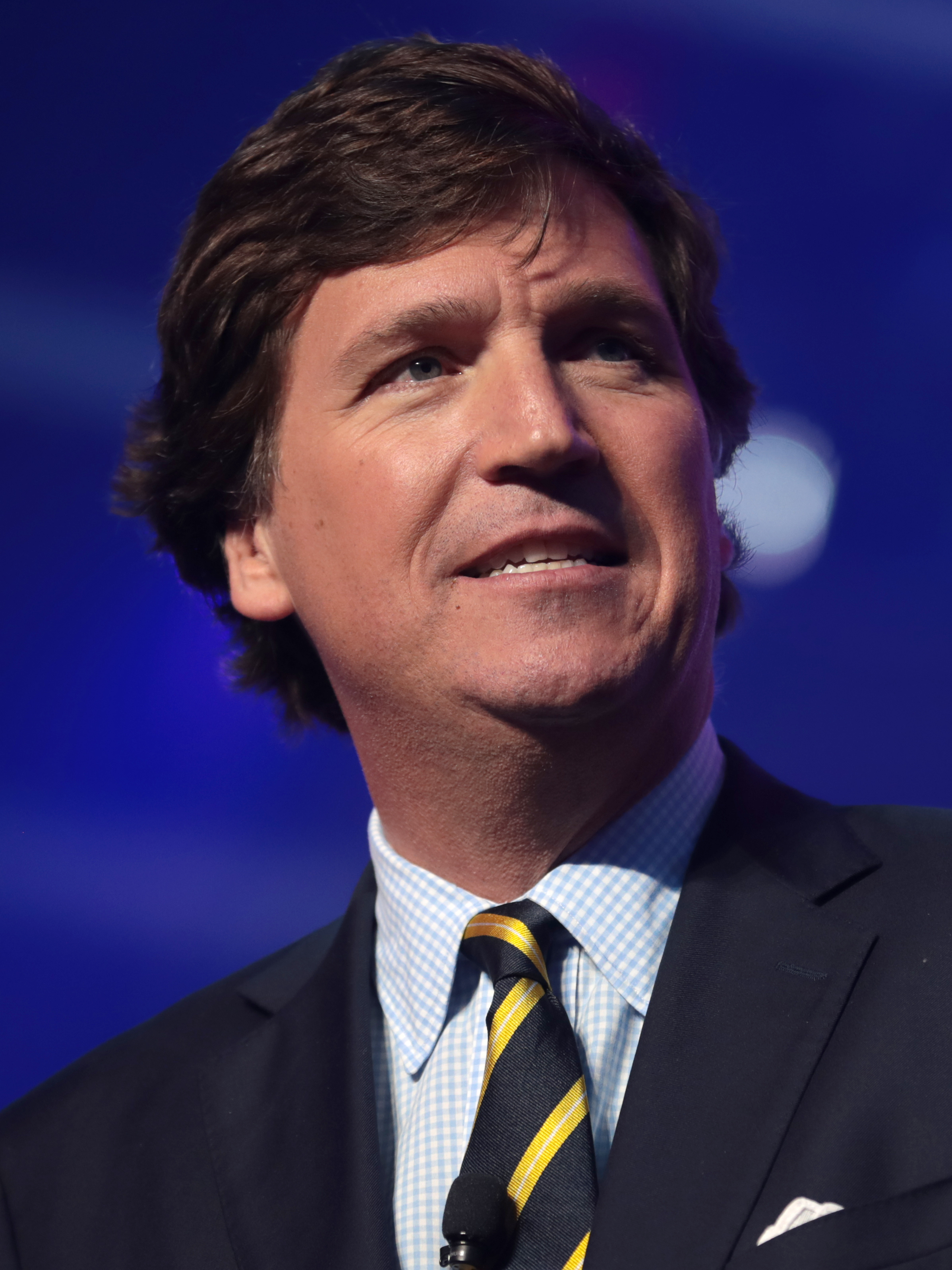
Tucker Carlson, right-wing conservative political commentator

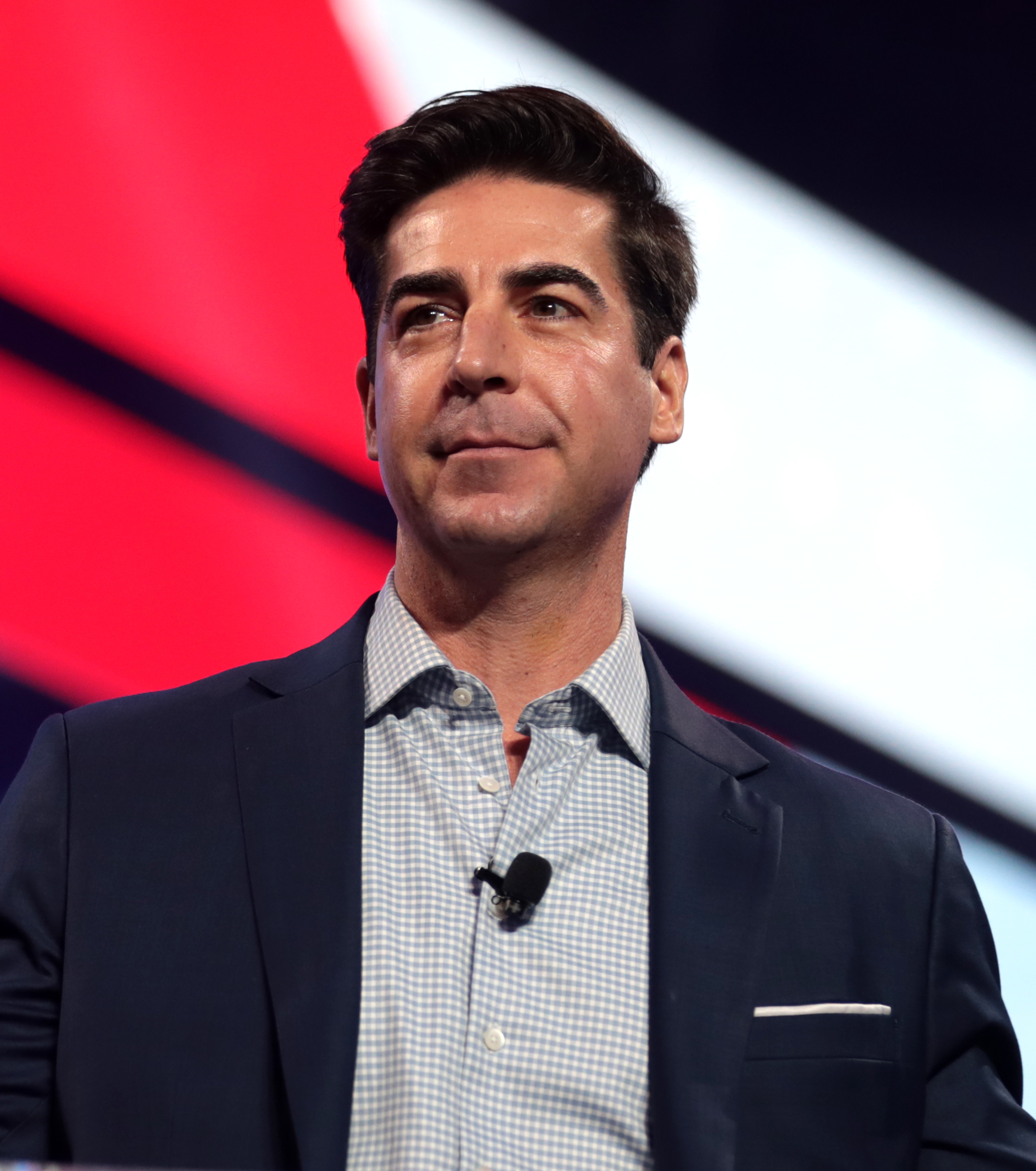
Jesse Watters, conservative political commentator and Fox News host

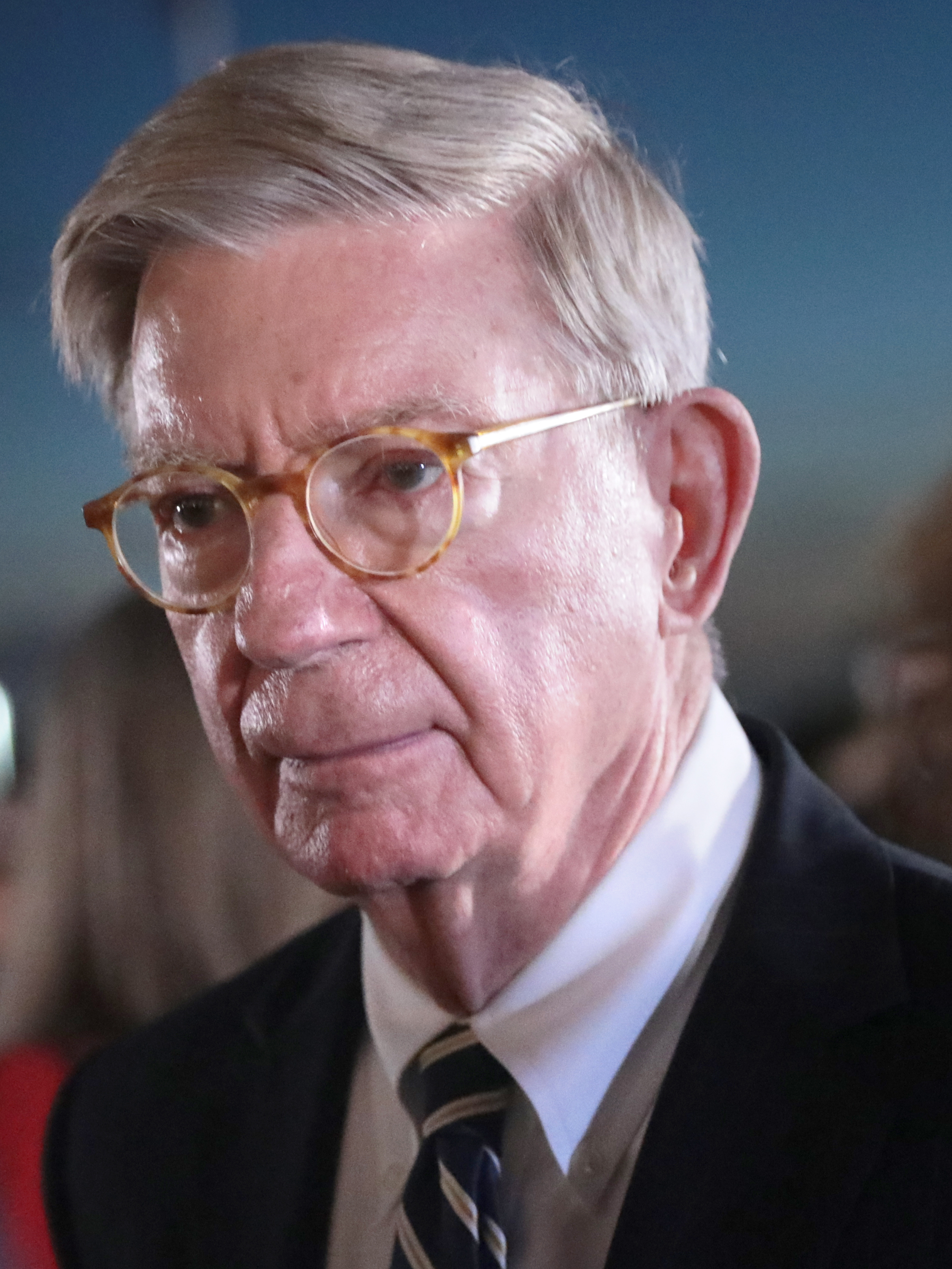
George Will, libertarian-conservative political commentator and author

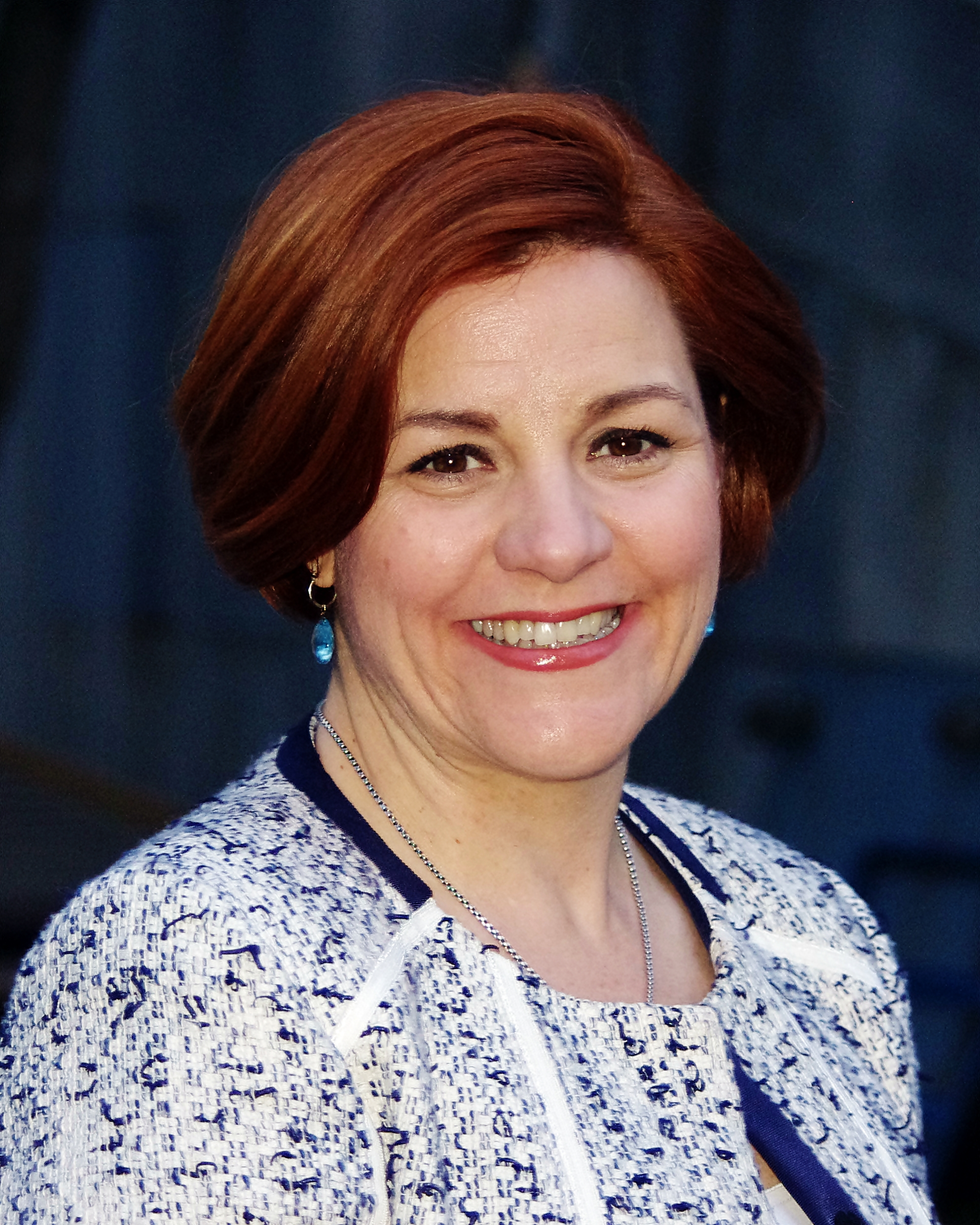
Christine Quinn, former Speaker of the New York City Council

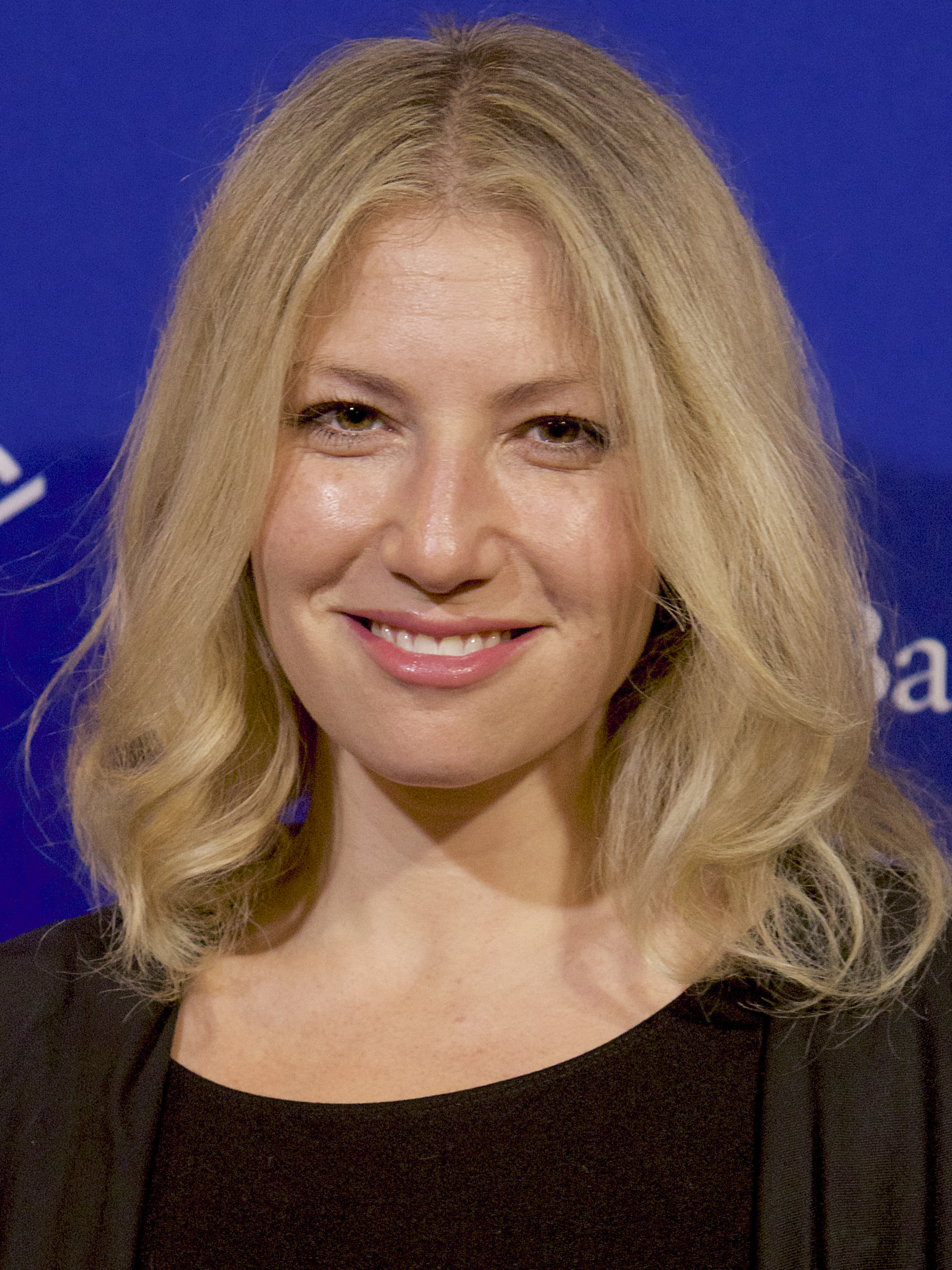
Ari Graynor, actress

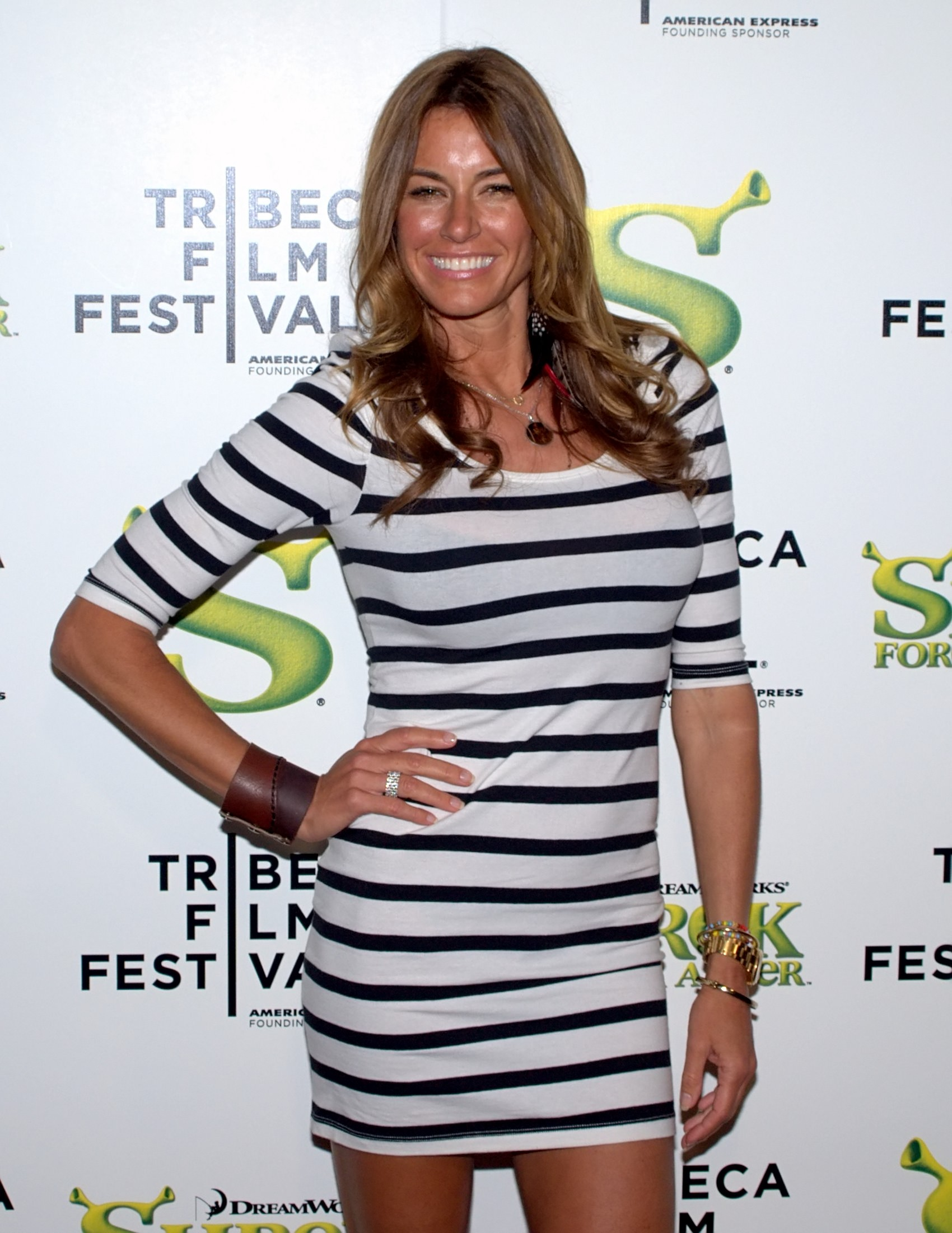
Kelly Killoren Bensimon, cast member on The Real Housewives of New York City

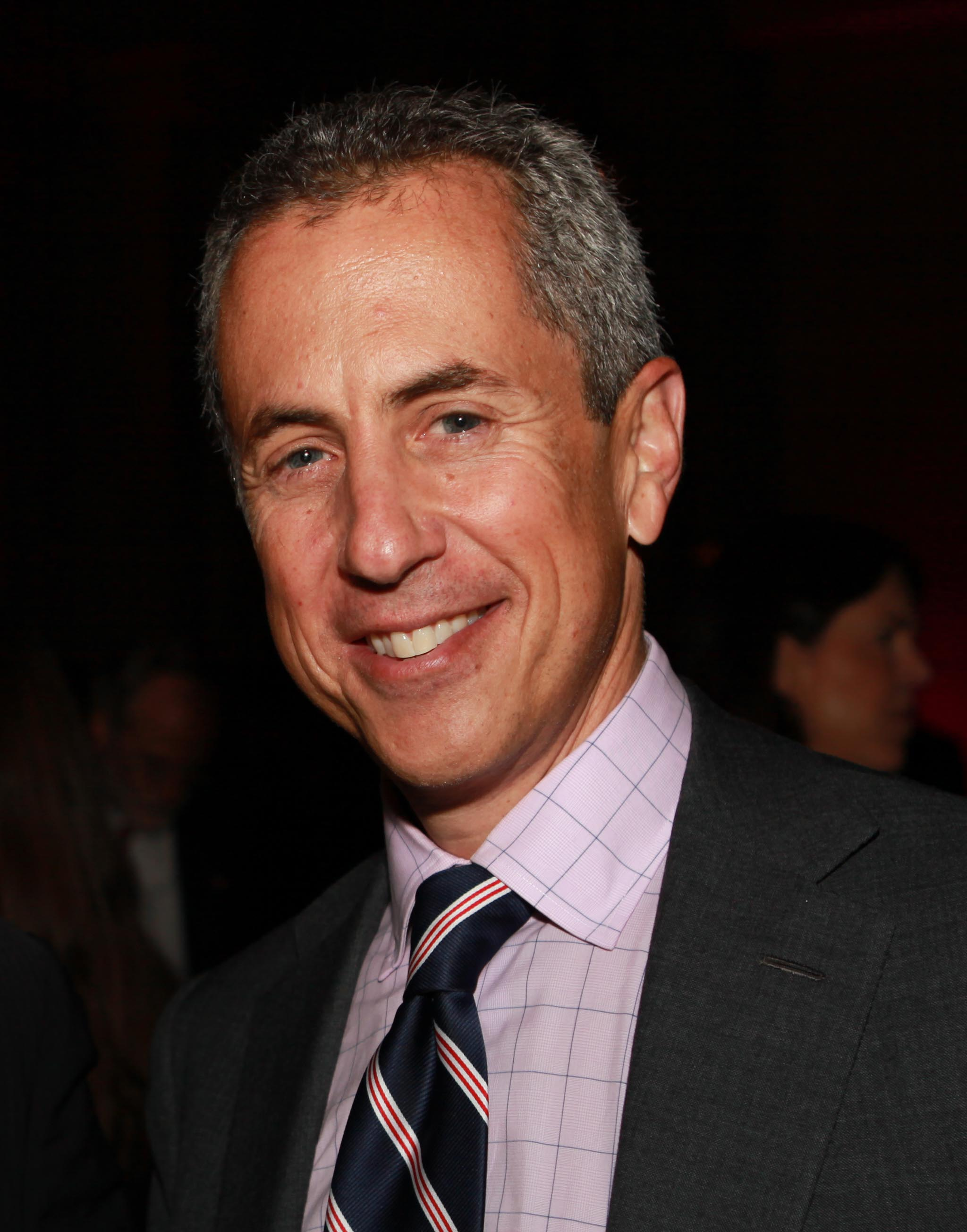
Danny Meyer, founder of Shake Shack

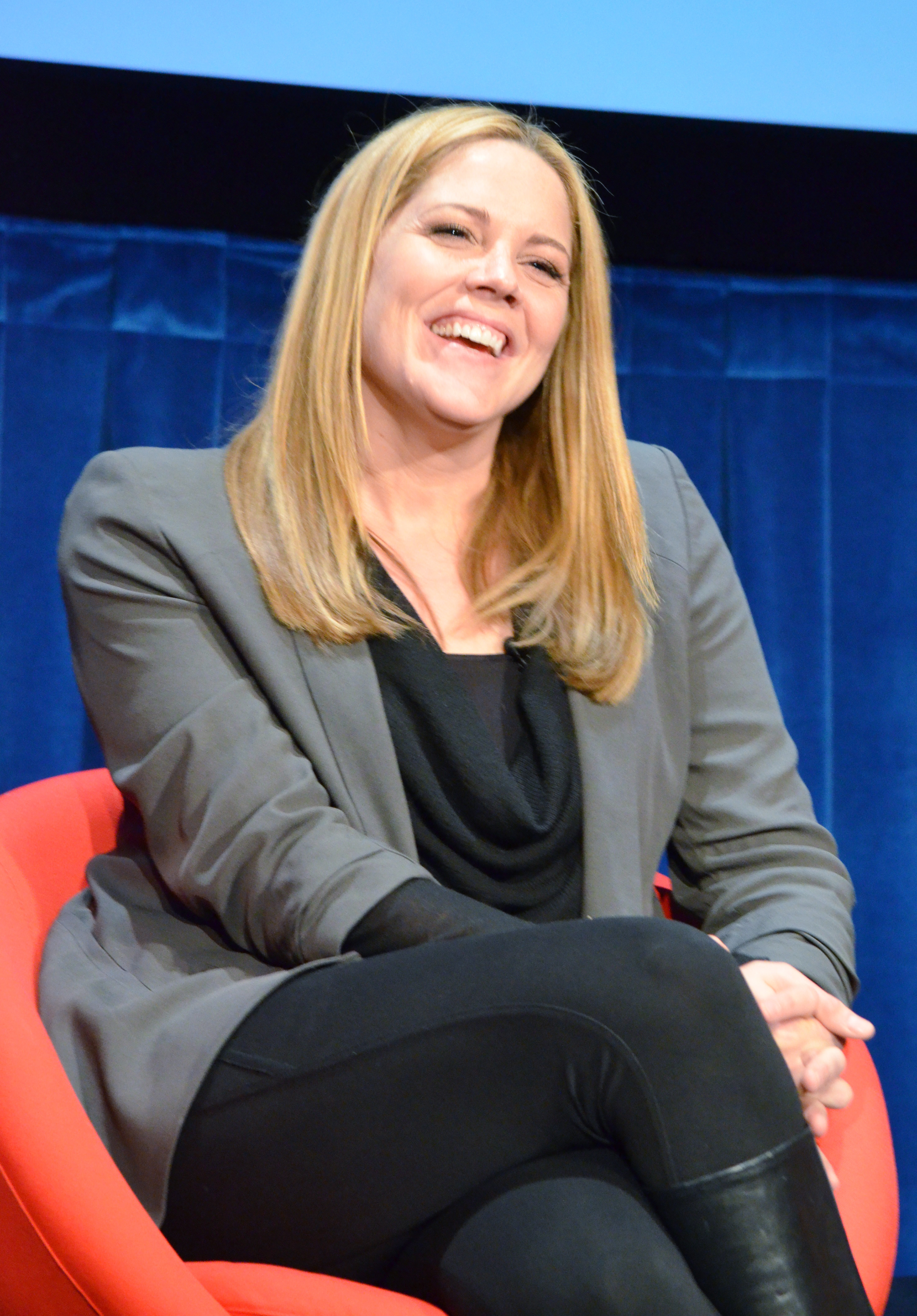
Mary McCormack, actress

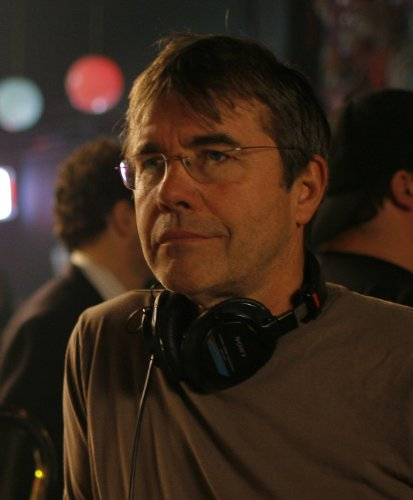
Stephen Gyllenhaal, film director

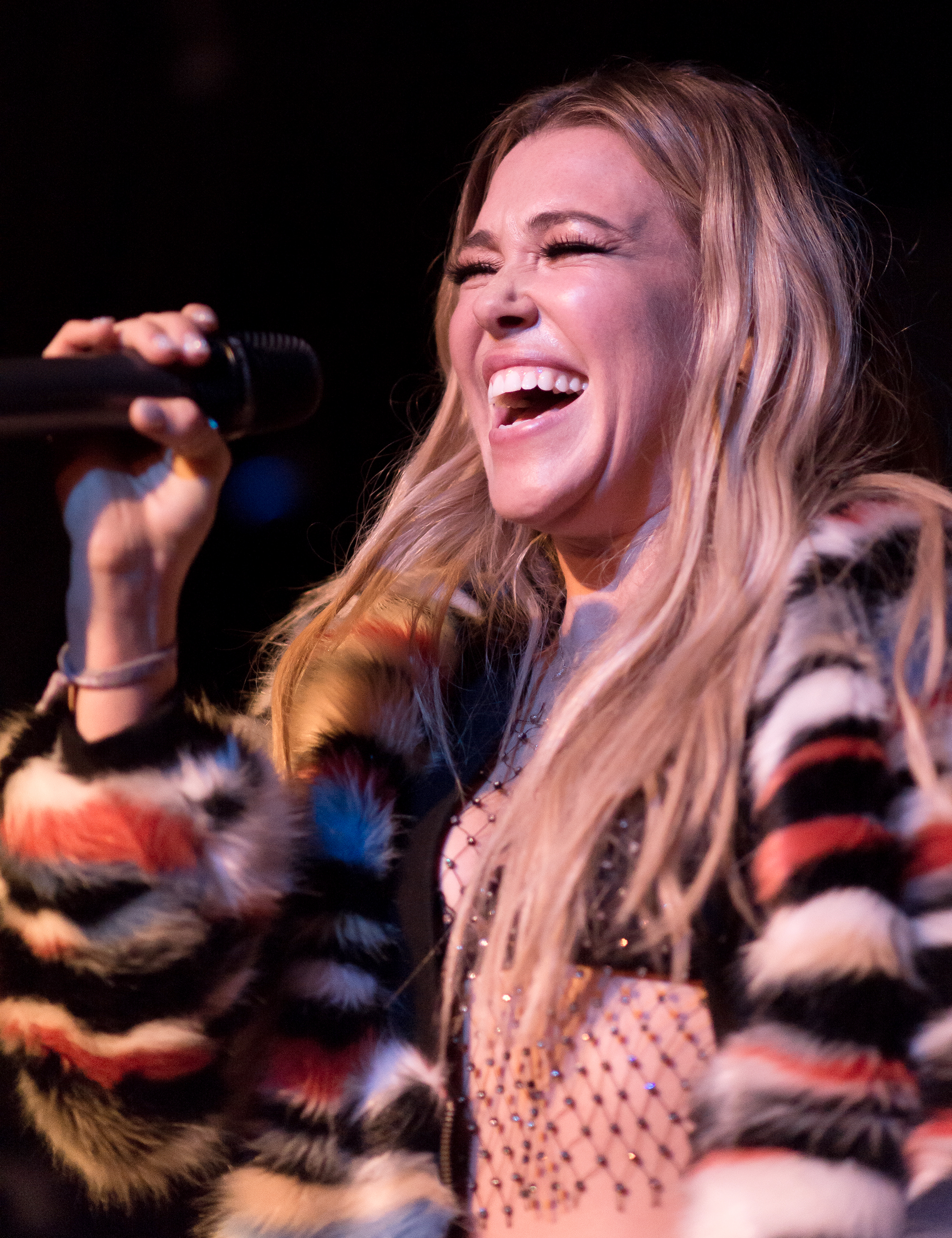
Rachel Platten, singer-songwriter

Trinity College's distinguished alumni include many influential and historical people, including governors, US Cabinet members, federal judges, political commentators and journalists, and senior executives in business and industry.

Notable alumni of Trinity College include:

- Kristine Belson, Class of 1986, president of Sony Pictures Animation and Oscar-nominated film producer (The Croods)
- S. Prestley Blake, co-founder of Friendly's
- Joseph Buffington, judge, United States Court of Appeals for the Third Circuit
- Christopher T. Calio, Chairman and Chief Executive Officer of RTX
- Tucker Carlson, Class of 1991, political commentator, co-founder of The Daily Caller, former host of Fox News Channel's Tucker Carlson Tonight, former host of Fox Nation's Tucker Carlson Today
- Tom Chappell, founder of Tom's of Maine
- Martin W. Clement, president of the Pennsylvania Railroad Company, 1935 to 1948.
- Percival W. Clement, 57th Governor of Vermont
- Thomas R. DiBenedetto, president of Boston International Group, owner and former chairman of AS Roma
- Elizabeth Elting, Class of 1987, businesswoman, entrepreneur, philanthropist and co-founder of TransPerfect
- Peter Eisler, investigative journalist for Reuters, 2026 Pulitzer Prize for National Reporting winner
- JoAnne A. Epps, law professor, legal author, Provost and 13th President of Temple University
- Edward Miner Gallaudet, first president of Gallaudet University
- David Gottesman, billionaire, founder of First Manhattan Co., and member of Berkshire Hathaway's board of directors
- Henry McBride, fourth Governor of Washington State
- Mary McCormack, actress (In Plain Sight, The West Wing). Her two siblings are also Trinity graduates. Bridget McCormack is Chief Justice of the Michigan Supreme Court, and Will McCormack is an actor.
- Mitchell M. Merin, former president and chief operating officer of Morgan Stanley Investment Management
- James Murren, chairman of the board and chief executive officer of MGM Resorts International
- Neil Patel, American lawyer, conservative political advisor to Vice President Dick Cheney, publisher and co-founder of The Daily Caller
- Gregory Anthony Perdicaris, first U.S. Consul to Greece
- Charles R. Perrin, chairman of Warnaco, former chairman and CEO of Avon Products and of Duracell
- John S. Phelps, 23rd Governor of Missouri
- Rachel Platten, singer-songwriter
- William C. Richardson, board director of Exelon; former president of Johns Hopkins University
- Jane Swift, Class of 1987, former Acting Governor of Massachusetts
- Jesse Watters, Class of 2001, conservative commentator, host of Jesse Watters Primetime, and co-host of The Five on Fox News
- John Williams, eleventh presiding bishop of the Episcopal Church in the United States
- Leo Wise (1849–1933), newspaper editor and publisher
- Charles C. Van Zandt, 34th Governor of Rhode Island
