= USS Sigourney (DD-643) =

Fletcher-class destroyer

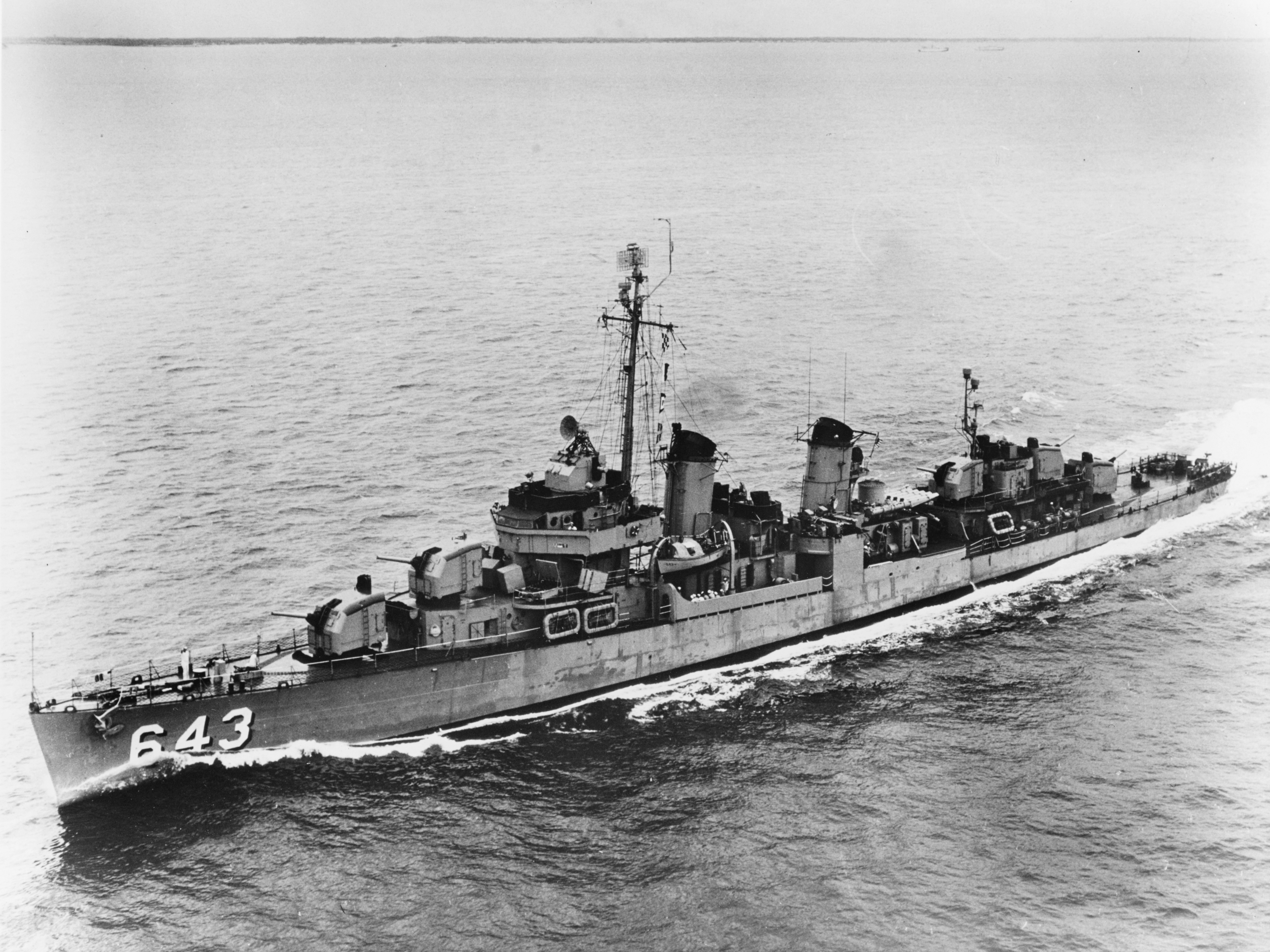
- USS Sigourney (DD-643) underway during the early or middle 1950s.

History

United States
- Namesake: James Sigourney
- Builder: Bath Iron Works
- Laid down: 7 December 1942
- Launched: 24 April 1943
- Commissioned: 29 June 1943
- Decommissioned: 1 May 1960
- Stricken: 1 December 1974
- Fate: Sold for scrap, 31 July 1975

General characteristics
- Class & type: Fletcher-class destroyer
- Displacement: 2,050 tons
- Length: 376 ft 6 in (114.7 m)
- Beam: 39 ft 8 in (12.1 m)
- Draft: 17 ft 9 in (5.4 m)
- Propulsion: 60,000 shp (45 MW); 2 propellers
- Speed: 35 knots (65 km/h; 40 mph)
- Range: 6500 nmi. (12,000 km); at 15 kt
- Complement: 329
- Armament: 5 × 5 in (130 mm), 4 × 40 mm AA guns, 4 × 20 mm AA guns, 10 × 21 inch (533 mm) torpedo tubes, 6 × depth charge projectors, 2 × depth charge tracks

USS Sigourney (DD-643) was a Fletcher-class destroyer, the second ship of the United States Navy to be named for James Sigourney, an officer during the War of 1812.

Sigourney was laid down on 7 December 1942 by Bath Iron Works Corp., Bath, Maine, launched on 24 April 1943, sponsored by Miss Amy C. Olney; and commissioned on 29 June 1943.

== World War II ==
The destroyer underwent shakedown training in Casco Bay, Maine, and in the Bermuda operating area. After post-shakedown repairs, Sigourney sailed, on 14 September 1943, from Norfolk with cruiser Baltimore (CA-68) en route to the west coast. They arrived at San Diego on 3 October, and the DD departed the next day for Pearl Harbor. She was routed onward to Espiritu Santo, New Hebrides. The ship arrived on 25 October at Port Vila and then at Espiritu Santo on 26 October, where she was assigned to Destroyer Squadron 22 (DesRon 22), Destroyer Division 44 (DesDiv 44).

=== Southwest Pacific campaigns ===
Staging was then in progress for the invasion of Cape Torokina, Bougainville, Solomon Islands. Sigourney escorted the transports of the assault phase to the landing area and then participated in the preliminary bombardment of the landing beaches on 1 November 1943. The ship was under air attack but suffered no damage while shooting down two enemy planes. Sigourney then participated in resupply operations, with Task Force 31 (TF 31), from Tulagi to the beachhead. On the morning of 17 November, the destroyer was escorting a convoy to Empress Augusta Bay when it was attacked by Japanese planes. The convoy was illuminated by flares and torpedo planes began their runs. The high speed transport, McKean (APD-5), was struck by a torpedo and began to burn furiously. Sigourney and Talbot (DD-114) were alongside for approximately two hours trying to rescue survivors. Sigourney rescued 34 but as the two destroyers were illuminated by the burning transport, they were under constant air attack. Neither was damaged, and Sigourney shot down two of the planes.

On 10 December, Sigourney was damaged when she ran aground near Koiare, Bougainville.

Sigourney and her squadron continued operations with TF 31 until 6 May 1944. The destroyer participated in antisubmarine sweeps, barge hunts, and in combined operations with PT boats and supporting aircraft. In February 1944, the destroyer was a unit in the Green Islands Attack Group which landed New Zealand troops there on the 15th. On the night of 29 February–1 March, Sigourney, with DesRon 22, engaged in an antishipping sweep of Simpson Harbor and then bombarded Rabaul and the airfield on Duke of York Island in the Bismarck Archipelago.

During March, Sigourney and her destroyer division operated under the direction of the Commanding General, U.S. XVI Corps, in support of forces on Bougainville. They provided counter-battery fire, bombarded enemy troops and installations ashore, and performed fire support as requested. Sigourney engaged in daily bombardments in the Jaba River and Motapena Point area and supported PT boat operations at night. On 12 March alone, Sigourney and Eaton (DD-510) fired 400 rounds of call fire in support of the 37th Infantry Division perimeter.

In mid-March, Sigourney was called upon to support the landing of the 4th Marine Regiment at Emirau, St. Matthias Group. She then returned to bombard pill boxes and entrenchments east of the Torokina River, Bougainville, until 12 April.

Sigourney then made escort trips between Guadalcanal, Cape Gloucester, Purvis Bay, Majuro, Eniwetok and Kwajalein. On 11 May, the destroyer sortied from Kwajalein with Task Group 51.18 (TG 51.18), the Joint Expeditionary Force, Reserve, for the amphibious assault on Saipan and Tinian in the Mariana Islands. Sigourney arrived off Saipan, on 16 June, and participated in operations there and on Tinian until she withdrew from the operations area on 20 August. During her time on station, she bombarded beaches on both islands, supplied call-fire support for the forces ashore, and served as a picket ship and as an antisubmarine screen.

When Sigourney was released from the Mariana Islands campaign, she sailed for Purvis Bay, Solomon Islands, arriving on 25 August. There, she was attached to TF 32 which sortied on 8 September for the Palau Islands operation. From 15 to 30 September, the destroyer worked in conjunction with the aircraft carriers which launched attacks in support of the amphibious assault on Peleliu. Sigourney was in Seeadler Harbor, Admiralty Islands, from 3 to 12 October. Then she got underway for Leyte, Philippines, with TG 77.2, the Bombardment and Fire Support Group.

=== Philippines campaigns ===
On 19 October 1944, Sigourney shelled Red and White Beaches to cover underwater demolition teams reconnoitering the landing sites near Dulag and Tacloban. She and Cony (DD-508) remained in the area while the remainder of TG 77.2 withdrew to the south to cover the approaches to Leyte Gulf through Surigao Strait. The two destroyers fired night harassing and interdiction fire on beaches, roads, and installations. On the 20th, they bombarded the beaches until H-hour and then provided call-fire support until the 24th when word was received from the Commander, 7th Fleet, to prepare for a night engagement. Sigourney, Aulick (DD-569), and Welles (DD-628) were in the van as Attack Section 2 of DesDiv "X-Ray" which would screen the battle line consisting of six battleships. In the screening position, they did not take part in the torpedo attacks on the Japanese fleet launched by other American destroyers. On 29 October, Sigourney withdrew from Leyte and returned to Seeadler Harbor, arriving on 3 November.

Nine days later, the destroyer was en route back to Leyte Gulf. She performed screening assignments and radar picket duties at the entrance to the gulf off Dinagat Island from 6 to 30 November. On the night of 1–2 December, DesDiv 44 made a sweep of the Camotes Sea. At 02:38 on 2 December, Sigourney and Conway (DD-507) opened fire on a Japanese freighter which sank six minutes later. The destroyers then steamed for the Palau Islands to join the covering force for the invasion of Mindoro. The task group of four battleships, four cruisers, six escort carriers, and 18 destroyers sailed on the 10th. Three days later, the carriers began launching air attacks which continued until 17 December. During the time in the area, the task group was under constant enemy air attack.

Sigourney next joined TG 79.2 (Attack Group Baker) which was formed at Manus Island and sortied from there on 31 December 1944 en route to the Philippine Islands. On 9 January 1945, the task group landed elements of the U.S. 6th Army in the Lingayen area of Luzon Island. On the 20th, Sigourney and Saufley (DD-465) left to screen Australian Transport Division 21 to Morotai, N.E.I. The destroyer escorted convoys between Leyte and Lingayen Gulfs until 27 February when she sailed with Task Unit 78.2.12 (TU 78.2.12) for Puerto Princesa, Palawan Island, to support the landings there on the 28th by United States Army troops. Still conducting operations in the Philippine Islands during April, Sigourney operated with TG 74.2 prior to, and during the army assault on the Malabang, Parang, and Cotabato areas of Mindanao on 17 April. On 6 May, the destroyer sailed from the Philippine Islands for the United States via the Marshall Islands and Pearl Harbor.

Sigourney arrived at San Pedro, Calif., on 31 May and entered the Bethlehem Steel Co. Shipyard for an overhaul, remaining there until 3 September. She moved to San Diego the next day and, a month later was underway, for New York City via the Panama Canal, arriving there on 20 October. In October, the destroyer was ordered to Charleston, S.C., to prepare for inactivation. On 20 March 1946, she was placed out of commission, in reserve, with the Atlantic Reserve Fleet.

== 1951 – 1960 ==
Sigourney was placed in full commission again on 7 September 1951 at Charleston, S.C. She underwent shakedown training at Guantanamo Bay in early 1952 and, in April, joined DesRon 322 with Norfolk as her home port. She conducted local operations from there until October when she entered the Norfolk Naval Shipyard for an overhaul which lasted until January 1953. She returned to Guantanamo Bay for refresher training until March, after which she operated out of her home port. On 29 June, Sigourney began a combined seven-month Far East tour and round-the-world cruise. While in Korean waters, the destroyer was attached to TF 77, the Fast Carrier Force, and TF 95, the United Nations Blockading and Escort Force.

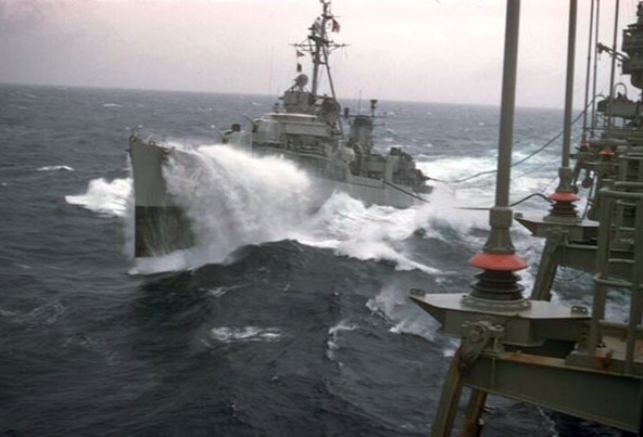
Sigourney refueling from USS Franklin D. Roosevelt (CVA-42) in the Med, 1957.

On 10 December 1953, Sigourney began her goodwill cruise which took her to Hong Kong, Singapore, Naples, Cannes, Gibraltar, and Lisbon before returning to Norfolk on 6 February 1954. In June, she took a Midshipman cruise to France and Spain before returning to her home port in August. The destroyer was overhauled from October 1954 until January 1955.

Sigourney made a cruise to Europe with DesDiv 322 in 1955, Midshipman cruises to Europe in 1956 and 1958, and was deployed with the 6th Fleet in 1957. On 1 January 1959, her home port was changed to Philadelphia, and she became part of the Reserve Training Fleet. On 1 May 1960, she was placed in reserve out of commission, with the Atlantic Reserve Fleet and berthed at Philadelphia.

Sigourney was stricken 1 December 1974, sold 31 July 1975 and broken up for scrap.

== Awards ==
Sigourney received nine battle stars for World War II service.

== In popular culture ==
The Sigourney appeared in the movie Away All Boats, accurately depicting the Fletcher destroyer class's anti-aircraft role in the Pacific Theater.
