= James Sigourney =

James Butler Sigourney (about 1790 – 14 July 1813) was an officer in the United States Navy who was killed during the War of 1812.

== Biography ==
Sigourney was born in Boston, Massachusetts, and was appointed midshipman on 16 January 1809. He served in Wasp and then became sailing master of the brig, Nautilus. He was captured with his ship shortly after the outbreak of the War of 1812; and, after his exchange had been effected, he was placed in command of Asp, a schooner fitted out to defend the Chesapeake Bay. On 14 July 1813, Asp was attacked by three British barges but succeeded in driving them off. On a second attack, however, Asp was boarded, and Sigourney was killed at his post on deck.

== Namesakes ==
Two U.S. Navy ships have been named USS Sigourney in his honor.
