= Alexander S. Wadsworth =

United States Navy officer

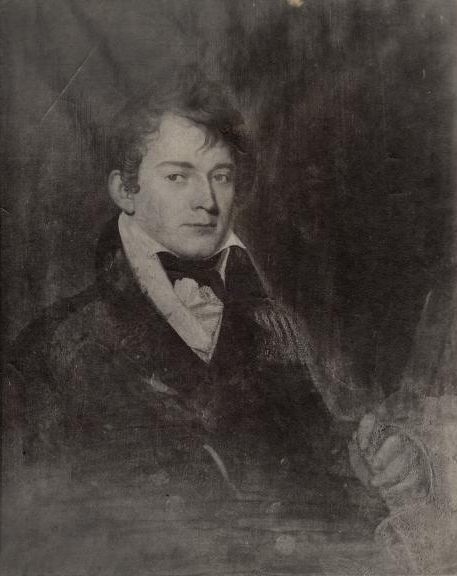
- Lt. Alexander S. Wadsworth
- Born: 1790
- Died: 5 April 1851

Commodore Alexander Scammel Wadsworth (1790–April 5, 1851) was an officer of the United States Navy. His more than 40 years of active duty included service in the War of 1812.

== Biography ==
Wadsworth was born in 1790 at Portland, Massachusetts. He was appointed a midshipman on 2 April 1804 and was promoted to lieutenant on 21 April 1810. Lt. Wadsworth was the first lieutenant on board Constitution during that frigate's successful engagement with HMS Guerriere in the War of 1812. For this action, he received a silver medal and was included in the vote of thanks received by the commanding officer, Isaac Hull, and his officers. Wadsworth later served as first lieutenant of the corvette Adams during that ship's cruise in 1814 when she captured 10 prizes.

Promoted to master commandant on 27 April 1816 for his services during the war, Wadsworth commanded the brig Prometheus in the Mediterranean Squadron after the Second Barbary War in 1816 and 1817 and later commanded the sloop John Adams. Under Wadsworth, John Adams conducted cruises in the West Indies in 1818–1819, and 1821–1822 for the suppression of piracy.

Promoted to captain on 3 March 1825, he commanded the frigate Constellation in the Mediterranean Squadron from 1829 to 1832. Wadsworth was commodore commanding the Pacific Squadron from 1834 to 1836, a member of the Board of Navy Commissioners from 1837 to 1840, and Inspector of Ordnance from 1841 to 1850. Commodore Wadsworth died at Washington, D.C., on 5 April 1851.

He was the son of Peleg Wadsworth, the uncle of author Henry Wadsworth Longfellow, and namesake of Alexander Scammel.

== Namesake ==
Three US Navy ships have been named USS Wadsworth in his honor.
