= Collegiate Gothic =

North American architectural style

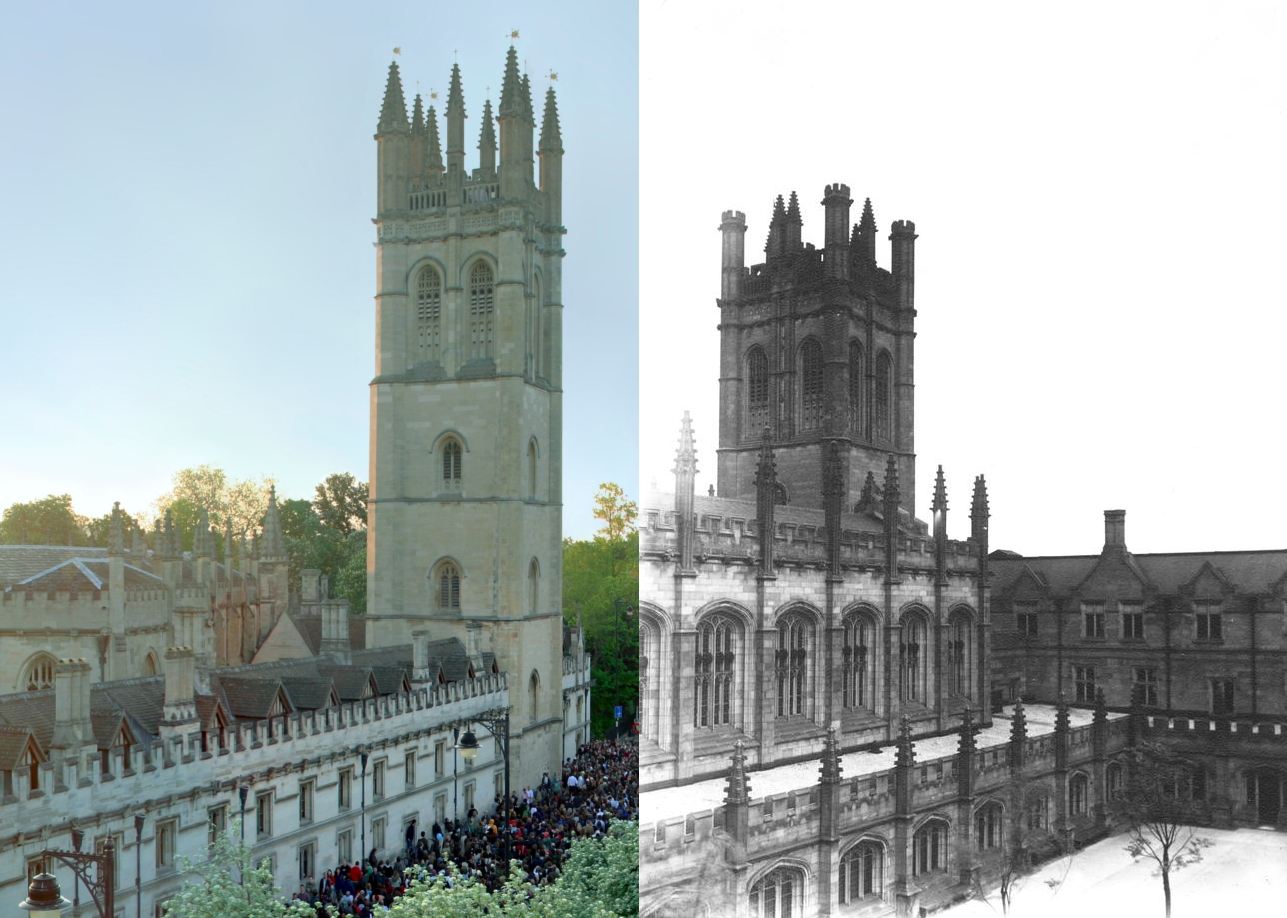
Mitchell Tower (1901–1908), University of Chicago, Shepley, Rutan & Coolidge, architects. Modeled after the Magdalen Tower (1492–1508), Oxford University (left).

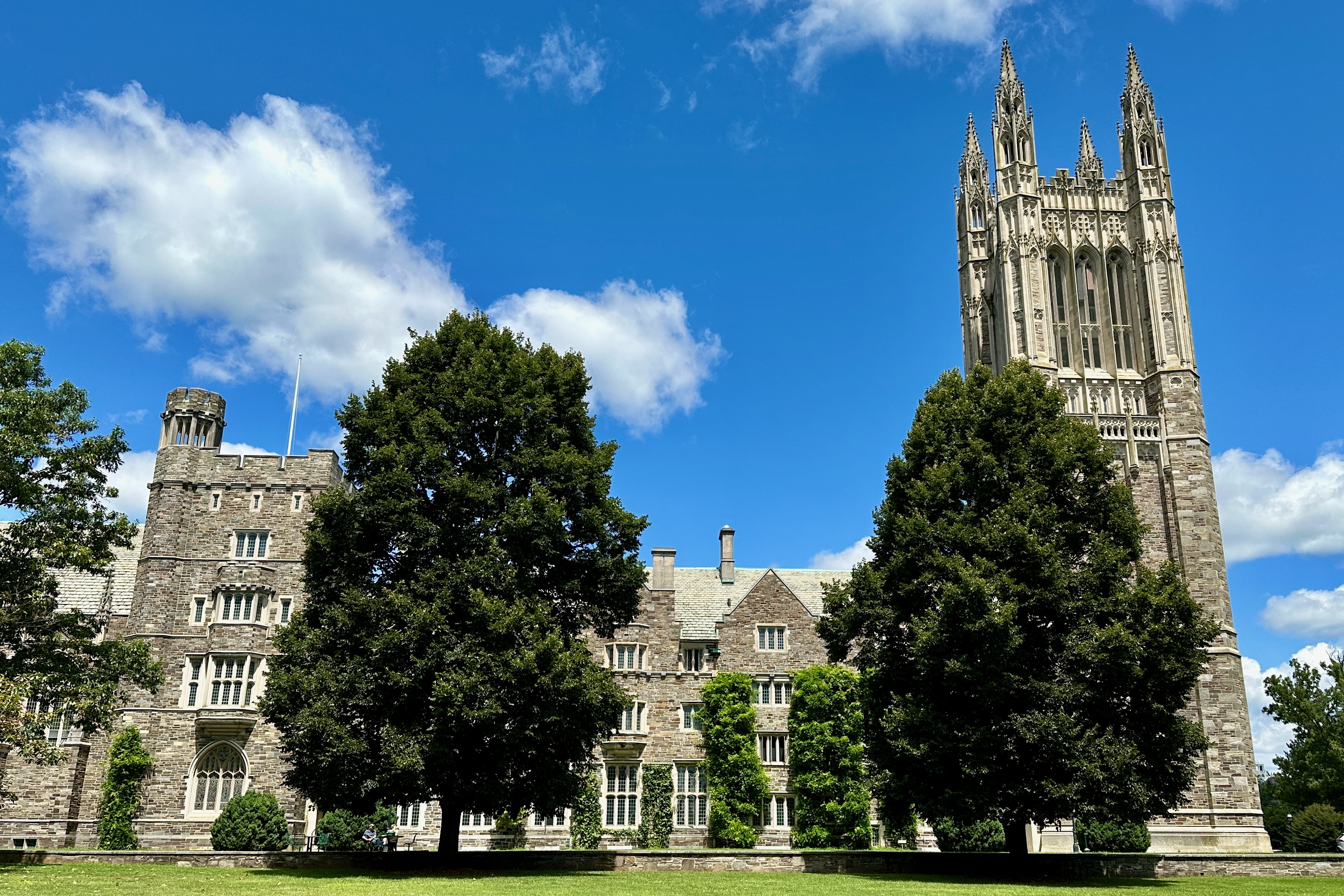
Princeton University Graduate College (1913), Ralph Adams Cram

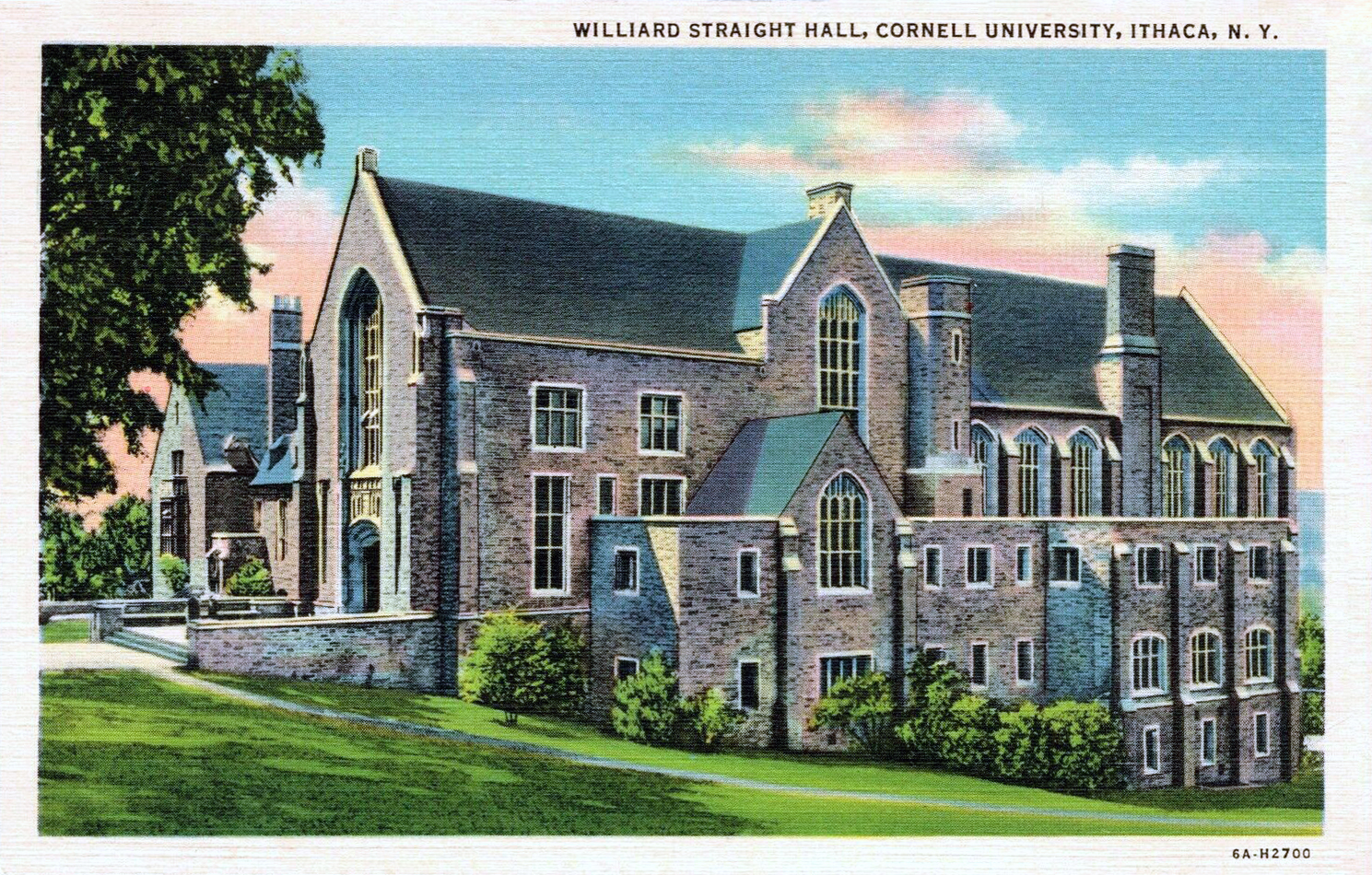
Willard Straight Hall (1925), Cornell University, William Adams Delano, architect

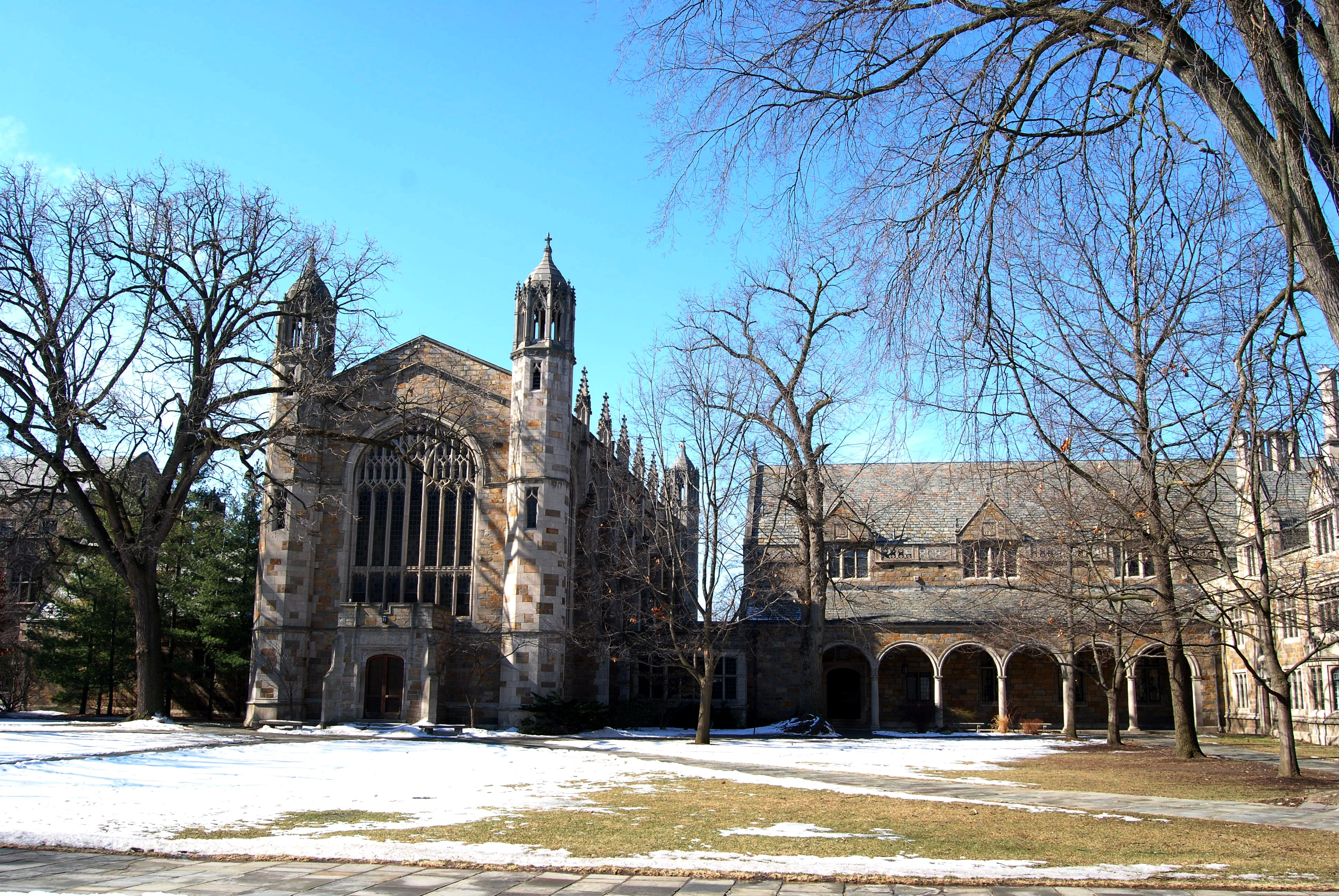
Law Quadrangle (1923–1933), University of Michigan, York and Sawyer

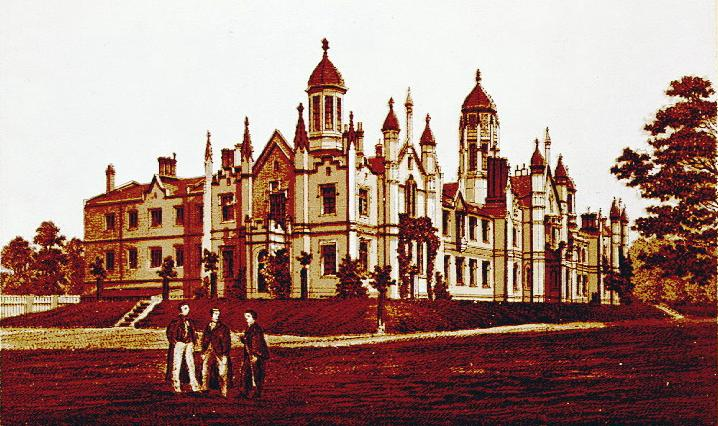
Trinity College (1851), University of Toronto, Kivas Tully

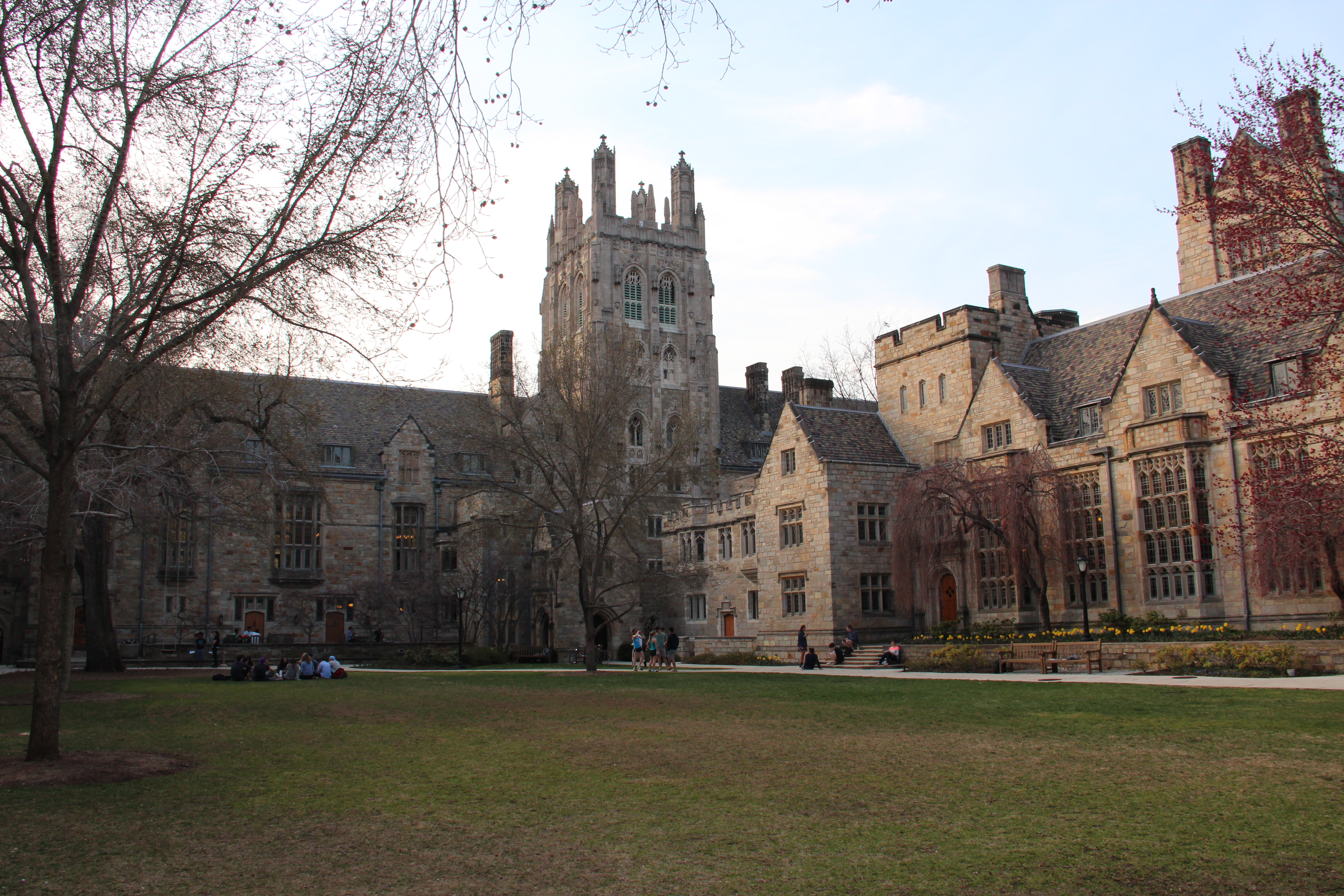
Memorial Quadrangle (1917–1921), Yale University, James Gamble Rogers

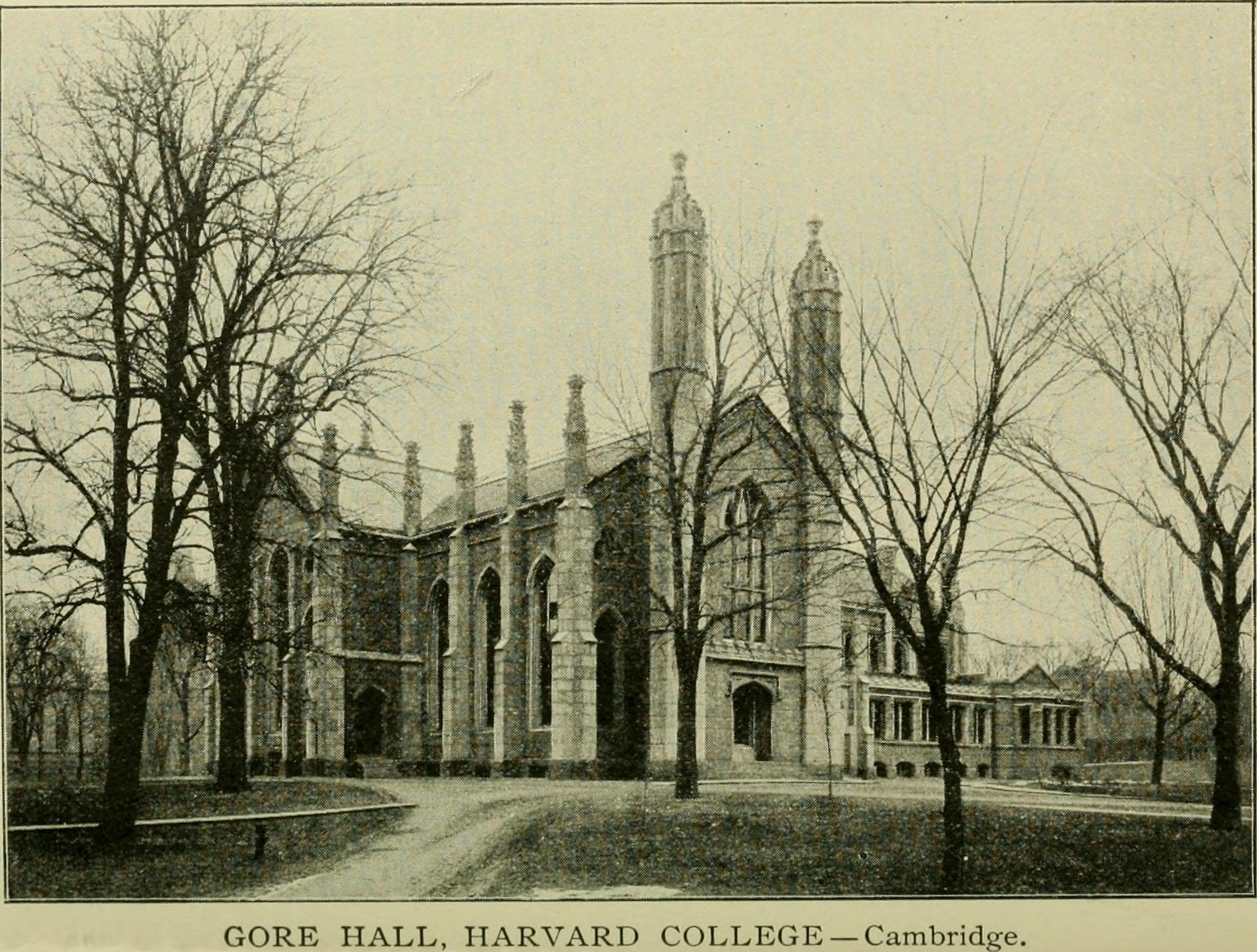
Gore Hall (1837–41) at Harvard College, Richard Bond, architect

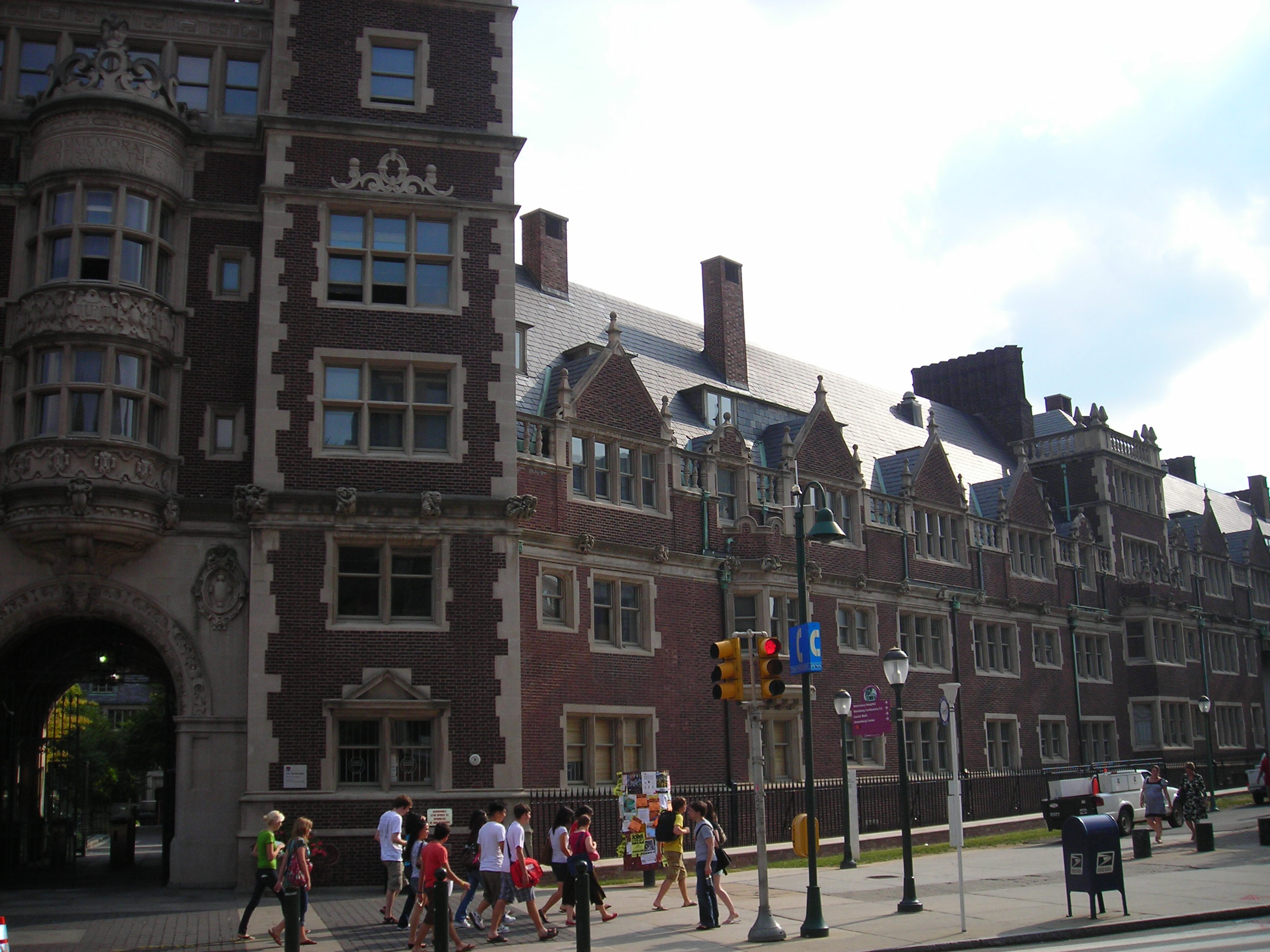
Quadrangle Dormitories (1894–1911), University of Pennsylvania, Cope and Stewardson, architects

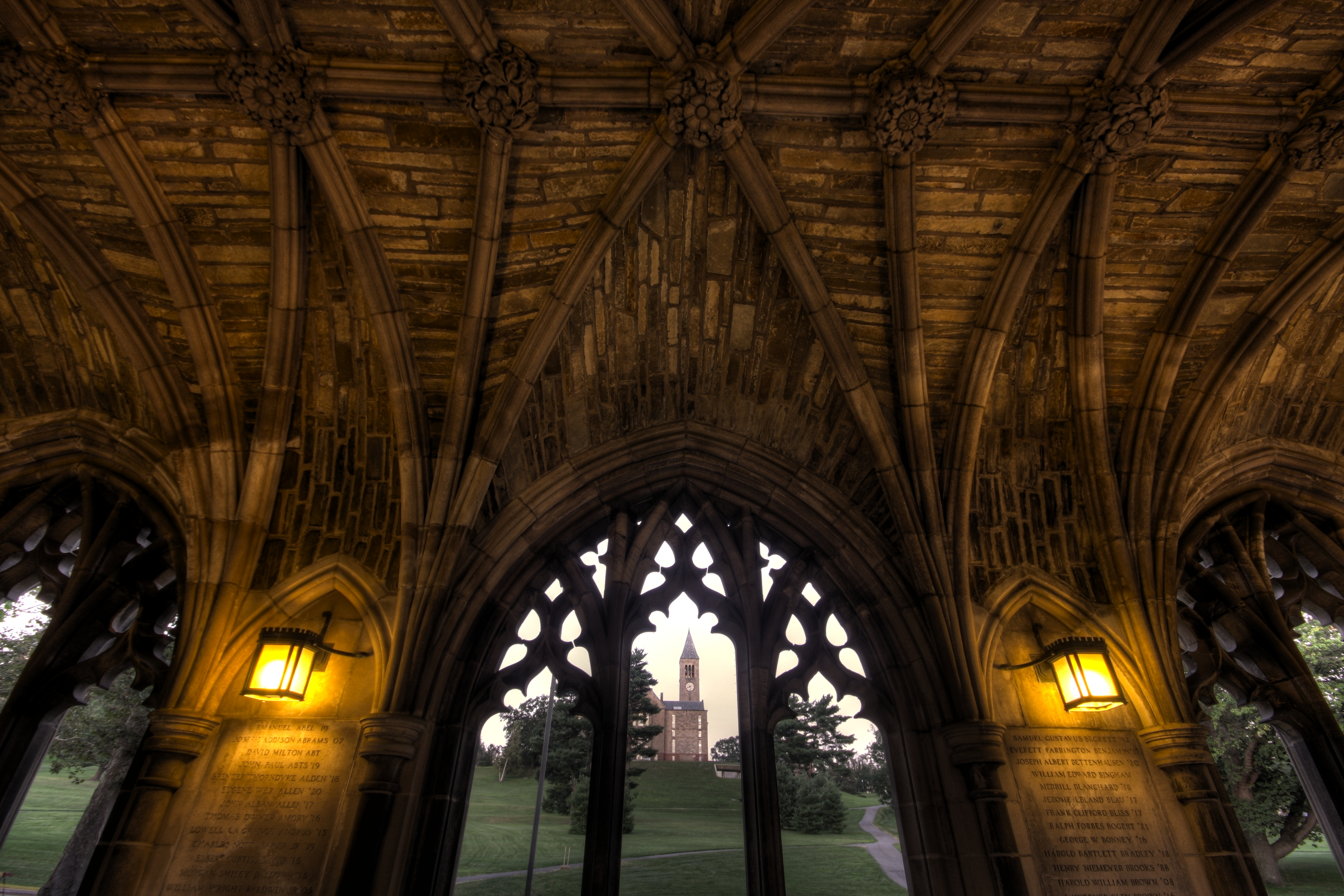
Cornell University, Lyon, McFaddin and War Memorial (1928), Charles Klauder

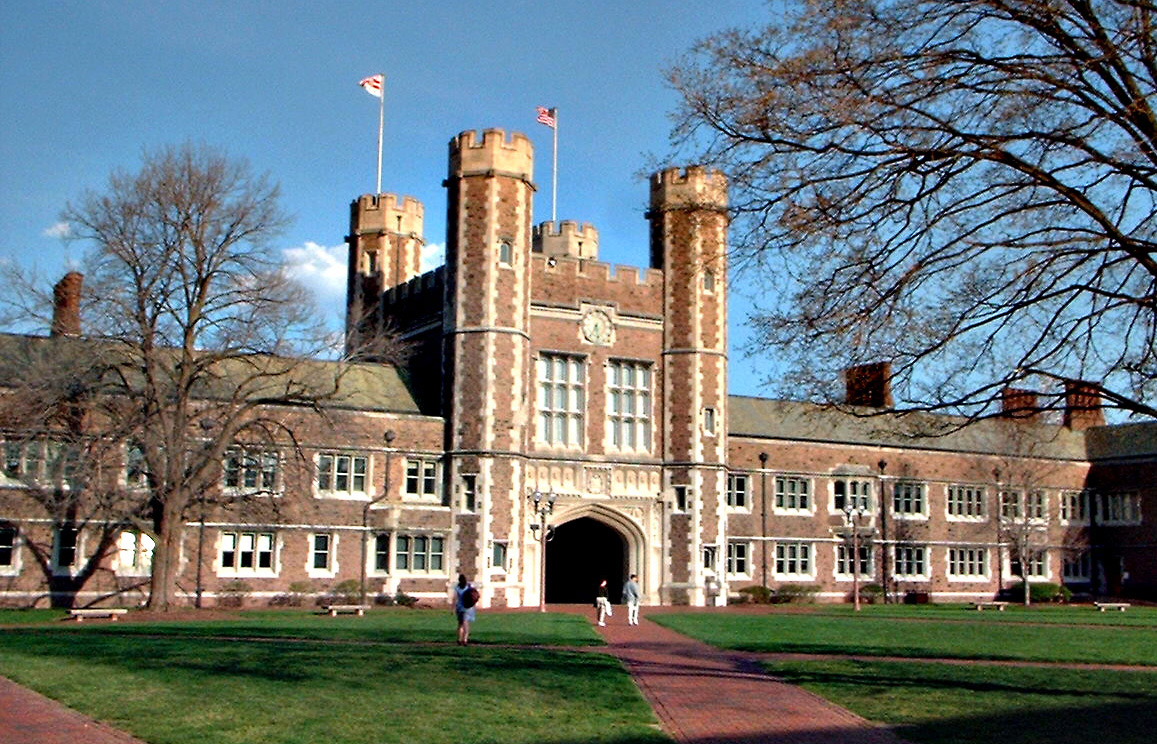
Brookings Hall (1902), Washington University

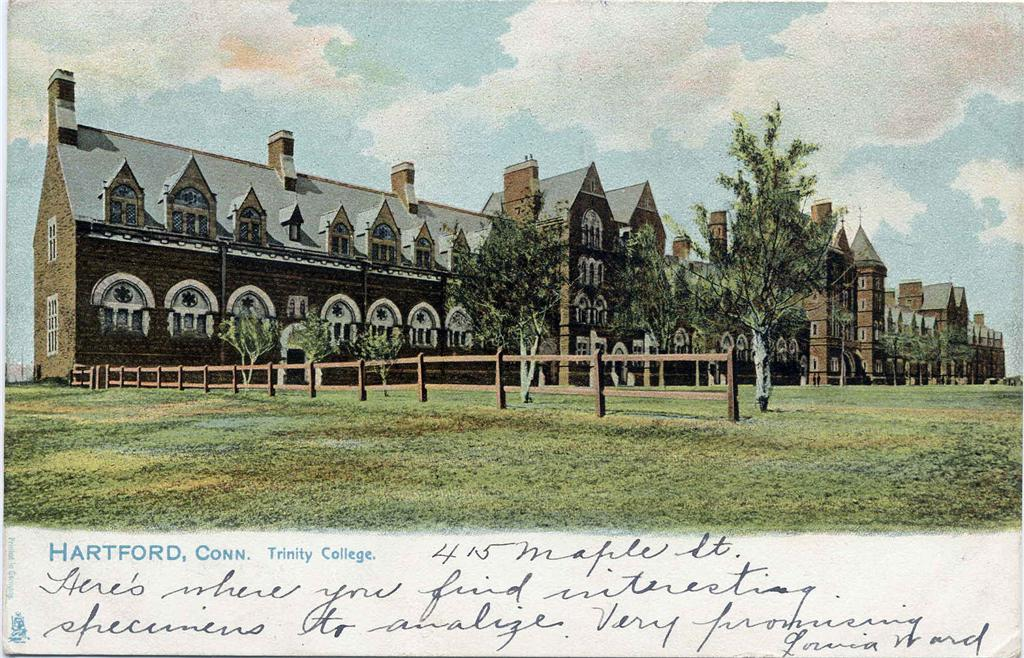
Trinity College (Connecticut), (1878) William Burges

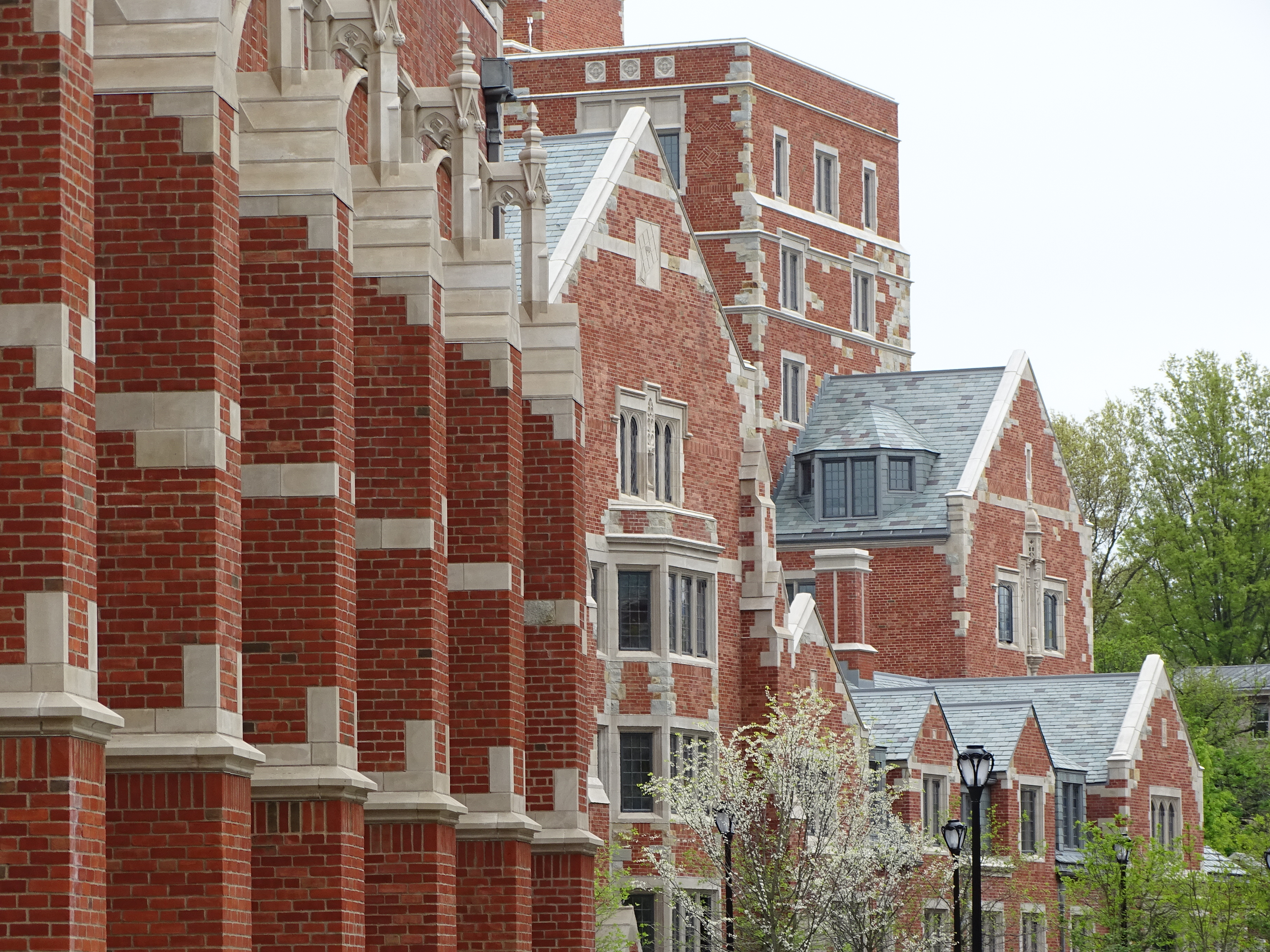
Benjamin Franklin College (2014–2017), Yale University

Collegiate Gothic is an architectural style subgenre of Gothic Revival architecture that first became popular in the late-19th and early-20th centuries for college and high school buildings in the United States and Canada, and to a certain extent Europe. A form of historicist architecture, it took its inspiration from English Tudor and Gothic buildings.

Ralph Adams Cram, arguably the leading Gothic Revival architect and theoretician of the movement, wrote about the appeal of the Gothic for educational facilities in his book The Gothic Quest: "Through architecture and its allied arts we have the power to bend men and sway them as few have who depended on the spoken word. It is for us, as part of our duty as our highest privilege to act ... for spreading what is true."

== History ==
=== Beginnings ===
Gothic Revival architecture was used for American college buildings as early as 1829, when "Old Kenyon" was completed on the campus of Kenyon College in Gambier, Ohio. Another early example was Alexander Jackson Davis's University Hall (1833–1837, demolished 1890), on New York University's Washington Square campus. Richard Bond's church-like library for Harvard College, Gore Hall (1837–1841, demolished 1913), became the model for other library buildings. James Renwick Jr.'s Free Academy Building (1847–1849, demolished 1928), for what is today City College of New York, continued in the style. Inspired by London's Hampton Court Palace, Swedish-born Charles Ulricson designed Old Main (1856–1857) at Knox College in Galesburg, Illinois.

Following the Civil War, many idiosyncratic High Victorian Gothic buildings were added to the campuses of American colleges. Examples include Worcester Polytechnic Institute (Boynton Hall, 1868, by Stephen C. Earle); Yale College (Farnam Hall, 1869–1870, by Russell Sturgis); the University of Pennsylvania (College Hall, 1870–1872, Thomas W. Richards); Harvard College (Memorial Hall, 1870–1877, William Robert Ware and Henry Van Brunt); and Cornell University (Sage Hall (1871–1875, Charles Babcock). In 1871, English architect William Burges designed a row of vigorous French Gothic-inspired buildings for Trinity College – Seabury Hall, Northam Tower, Jarvis Hall (all completed 1878) – in Hartford, Connecticut.

Tastes became more conservative in the 1880s, and "collegiate architecture soon after came to prefer a more scholarly and less restless Gothic."

=== Movement ===
Beginning in the late-1880s, Philadelphia architects Walter Cope and John Stewardson expanded the campus of Bryn Mawr College in an understated English Gothic style that was highly sensitive to site and materials. Inspired by the architecture of Oxford and Cambridge universities, and historicists but not literal copyists, Cope & Stewardson were highly influential in establishing the Collegiate Gothic style. Commissions followed for collections of buildings at the University of Pennsylvania (1895–1911), Princeton University (1896–1902), and Washington University in St. Louis (1899–1909), marking the nascent beginnings of a movement that transformed many college campuses across the country.

In 1901, the firm of Shepley, Rutan & Coolidge created a master plan for a Collegiate Gothic campus for the fledgling University of Chicago, then spent the next 15 years completing it. Some of their works, such as the Mitchell Tower (1901–1908), were near-literal copies of historic buildings.

George Browne Post designed the City College of New York's new campus (1903–1907) at Hamilton Heights, Manhattan, in the style.

The style was experienced up-close by a wide audience at the 1904 Louisiana Purchase Exposition in St. Louis, Missouri. The World's Fair and 1904 Olympic Games were held on the newly completed campus of Washington University, which delayed occupying its buildings until 1905.

The movement gained further momentum when Charles Donagh Maginnis designed Gasson Hall at Boston College in 1908. Maginnis & Walsh went on to design Collegiate Gothic buildings at some twenty-five other campuses, including the main buildings at Emmanuel College (Massachusetts), and the law school at the University of Notre Dame.

Ralph Adams Cram designed a series of Collegiate Gothic buildings for the Princeton University Graduate College (1911–1917).

James Gamble Rogers did extensive work at Yale University, beginning in 1917. Some critics claim he took historicist fantasy to an extreme, while others choose to focus on what is widely considered to be the resulting beautiful and sophisticated Yale campus. Rogers was criticized by the growing Modernist movement. His cathedral-like Sterling Memorial Library (1927–1930), with its ecclesiastical imagery and lavish use of ornament, came under vocal attack from one of Yale's own undergraduates:

A modern building constructed for purely modern needs has no excuse for going off in an orgy of meretricious medievalism and stale iconography.

Other architects, notably John Russell Pope and Bertram Goodhue (who just before his death sketched the original version of Yale's Sterling Library from which Rogers worked), advocated for and contributed to Yale's particular version of Collegiate Gothic.

When McMaster University moved to Hamilton, Ontario, Canadian architect William Lyon Somerville designed its new campus (1928–1930) in the style.

=== Origins of the term ===
American architect Alexander Jackson Davis is "generally credited with coining the term" documented in a handwritten description of his own "English Collegiate Gothic Mansion" of 1853 for the Harrals of Bridgeport, Connecticut. By the 1890s, the movement was known as "Collegiate Gothic".

=== 1904 commentary ===
In his praise for Cope & Stewardson's Quadrangle Dormitories at the University of Pennsylvania, architect Ralph Adams Cram revealed some of the racial and cultural implications underlying the Collegiate Gothic:

It was, of course, in the great group of dormitories for the University of Pennsylvania that Cope and Stewardson first came before the entire country as the great exponents of architectural poetry and of the importance of historical continuity and the connotation of scholasticism. These buildings are among the most remarkable yet built in America ...

First of all, let it be said at once that primarily they are what they should be: scholastic in inspiration and effect, and scholastic of the type that is ours by inheritance; of Oxford and Cambridge, not of Padua or Wittenberg or Paris. They are picturesque also, even dramatic; they are altogether wonderful in mass and in composition. If they are not a constant inspiration to those who dwell within their walls or pass through their "quads" or their vaulted archways, it is not their fault but that of the men themselves.

The [Spanish-American War Memorial] tower has been severely criticized as an archaeological abstraction reared to commemorate contemporary American heroism. The criticism seems just to me, though only in a measure. American heroism harks back to English heroism; the blood shed before Manila and on San Juan Hill was the same blood that flowed at Bosworth Field, Flodden, and the Boyne. Therefore the British base of the design is indispensable, for such were the racial foundations.

=== High rise expression ===
Collegiate Gothic complexes were most often horizontal compositions, save for a single tower or towers serving as an exclamation. Gamble designed the skyscraper Collegiate Gothic academic building at Northwestern University's downtown Chicago campus in the 1920s, completed in 1926. This was in the wake of the international 1921 Tribune Tower competition, which out of more than 200 entries from well-known architects, famously chose a neo-Gothic design by Howells and Hood for their commercial skyscraper.

At the University of Pittsburgh, Charles Klauder was commissioned by University of Pittsburgh chancellor John Gabbert Bowman to design a tall building in the form of a Gothic tower. What he produced, the Cathedral of Learning (1926–37), has been described as the literal culmination of late Gothic Revival architecture. A combination of Gothic spire and modern skyscraper, the steel-frame, limestone-clad, 42-story structure is both the world's second tallest university building and Gothic-styled edifice. The tower contain a half-acre Gothic hall supported only by its 52-foot (16 m) tall arches. It is accompanied by the campus's other Gothic Revival structures by Klauder, including the Stephen Foster Memorial (1935–1937) and the French Gothic Heinz Memorial Chapel (1933–1938).

=== 21st-century revival ===
A number of colleges and universities have commissioned major new buildings in the Collegiate Gothic style in recent years. These include Princeton University's Whitman College, designed by Porphyrios Associates, and Benjamin Franklin College and Pauli Murray College, both designed by Robert A.M. Stern Architects, at Yale University. The University of Southern California's USC Village was created as a less expensive post-modern nod to Collegiate Gothic revival. (Harley Ellis Devereaux, 2017).

== Architects of the Collegiate Gothic style ==
- Julian Abele
- Snowden Ashford
- Allen & Collens
- Cope & Stewardson
- Ralph Adams Cram
- William Augustus Edwards
- Philip H. Frohman
- Bertram Grosvenor Goodhue
- Charles C. Haight
- Guilbert and Betelle
- William Burges
- Charles Klauder
- Pond and Pond
- George Browne Post
- James Gamble Rogers
- Horace Trumbauer
- Dan Everett Waid
- David Webster
- York and Sawyer

== Examples ==
- Abyssinian Baptist Church – Harlem, New York City
- Altgeld's castles – a set of buildings within five Illinois universities (1896–1899)
- Augustana College (Illinois), Rock Island, Illinois – The Old Seminary, the Ascension Chapel, and Founders Hall (1923)
- Berry College – Ford buildings
- Boğaziçi University - South Campus (previously known as Robert College), Turkey (1863)
- Boston College – specifically Gasson Hall, Devlin Hall, St. Mary's Hall, and Bapst/Burns Library
- Bryn Athyn Cathedral of Bryn Athyn College
- Bryn Mawr College – Pembroke Hall (1894)
- Carleton College
- Central Commerce Collegiate / Central Toronto Academy, Toronto (1916)
- Central Technical School, Toronto
- City College of New York (1903), George Browne Post, architect
- College of Wooster – Kauke Hall
- Columbia University: Teachers College
- Cornell University
- Danforth Collegiate and Technical Institute, Toronto (1922–1923)
- Dobbs Ferry High School, Dobbs Ferry, New York (1934)
- Drew University, S.W. Bowne Great Hall (1912).
- Duke University – Duke Chapel (1930–1935), and West Campus, arch.
- East York Collegiate Institute (façade only), Toronto (1927)
- Eastern Commerce Collegiate Institute, Toronto, Canada (1925)
- Eastern Senior High School (1923), Washington, D.C.
- Emma Willard School
- Florida State University
- Fordham University – Rose Hill Campus
- Fordson High School, Dearborn, Michigan
- Franklin & Marshall College – Old Main, Goethean Hall, and Diagnothian Hall (1854–1857)
- Georgetown University – Healy Hall (1877-1879)
- Georgia Tech
- Grinnell College
- Harbord Collegiate Institute (1932), Toronto
- High Point Central High School (1926), (High Point, North Carolina)
- Hillsborough High School (Tampa, Florida)
- Indiana University-Bloomington
- Isaac E. Young Middle School, New Rochelle, New York
- John Carroll University
- John Marshall High School, Los Angeles, California
- Kenyon College
- Knox College – Old Main (1857)
- Lehigh University
- Loretto Abbey Catholic Secondary School – Toronto (1927)
- Loyola University Maryland
- Loyola University New Orleans – Marquette Hall (1910)
- McGill University, Montreal, Canada
- McKinley High School, St. Louis, Missouri
- McMaster University, Hamilton, Ontario, Canada
- The Mary Louis Academy, Jamaica Estates, New York (1937)
- Melbourne High School, Melbourne, Australia – the Twenties Building
- Michigan State University
- Milliken Public School, Markham – façade only (1929)
- Mimico High School, Toronto (1924) – now occupied by John English Middle School
- New Jersey Institute of Technology – Central King Building, the old Central High School of Newark (1911)
- North Toronto Collegiate Institute 1912 – demolished
- Northwestern University
- Northwest Missouri State University – Administration Building
- Oakwood Collegiate Institute, Toronto (1911)
- Oglethorpe University, Atlanta, Georgia
- Park Vista, Seattle, Washington (1928)
- Parkdale Collegiate Institute, Toronto (1929)
- Princeton University – Blair Hall (1896)
- Providence College – Harkins Hall (1917)
- Queen's University at Kingston, Ontario, Canada
- R. H. King Academy, Toronto (formerly Scarborough High School/Collegiate Institute) – partially demolished and main entrance arch from original building remains (1922)
- Reed College, Oregon
- Rhodes College, Memphis, Tennessee
- Runnymede Collegiate Institute, Toronto (1927)
- Purdue University
- St. John's University Jamaica, New York. St. John Hall and St. Augustine Hall.
- Saint Joseph's University, Philadelphia, Pennsylvania
- Sewanee: The University of the South, Sewanee, Tennessee
- Trinity College, Connecticut
- United States Military Academy, West Point, New York
- University of Arkansas
- University of Chicago
- University of Connecticut East Campus
- University of Denver
- University of Florida
- University of Guelph – Main campus, Guelph, Ontario, Canada
- University of Idaho
- University of Iowa
- University of Michigan – Law Quadrangle (1923–33), Martha Cook Building (1915)
- University of Notre Dame
- University of Oklahoma
- University of Pennsylvania – Quadrangle Dormitories (1894–1911), Medical School (1904, 1928), Veterinary School and Hospital (1906, 1912), Law School (1900)
- University of Pittsburgh (Cathedral of Learning, Heinz Chapel, Stephen Foster Memorial, Clapp Hall)
- University of Richmond, Virginia
- University of St. Thomas, Minnesota
- University of Saskatchewan, Canada
- University of Southern California – Wallis Annenberg Hall
- University of Tennessee at Chattanooga
- University of Texas at Austin – Old Main (1882-1934) – demolished
- University of Toledo – University Hall and Memorial Field House, Ohio
- University of Toronto – St. George campus, Canada
- University of Washington in Seattle – Suzzallo Library (1926)
- The University of Western Ontario, London, Ontario, Canada
- Vanderbilt University – E. Bronson Ingram College,
- Vassar College
- Washington University in St. Louis – Brookings Hall (1900), and the Danforth Campus
- Virginia Polytechnic Institute and State University
- Wesleyan University
- West Chester University
- Western Technical-Commercial School, Toronto (1927)
- Weston Collegiate Institute/Vocational School (1923) – demolished and replaced by a modern building
- Williams College, Thompson Memorial Chapel
- Worcester Polytechnic Institute — Boynton Hall (1868)
- Yale University – Sterling Memorial Library, Harkness Tower, the Humanities Quadrangle and the Memorial Quadrangle; arch. James Gamble Rogers.
- York Memorial Collegiate Institute, Toronto (1929)

== Gallery ==
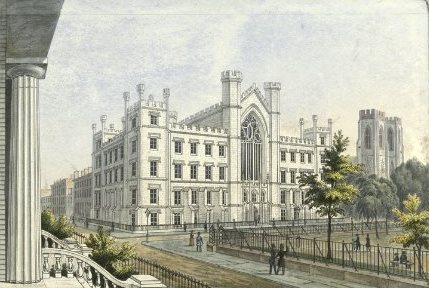
University Hall (1833–1837), New York University, Alexander Jackson Davis, architect.

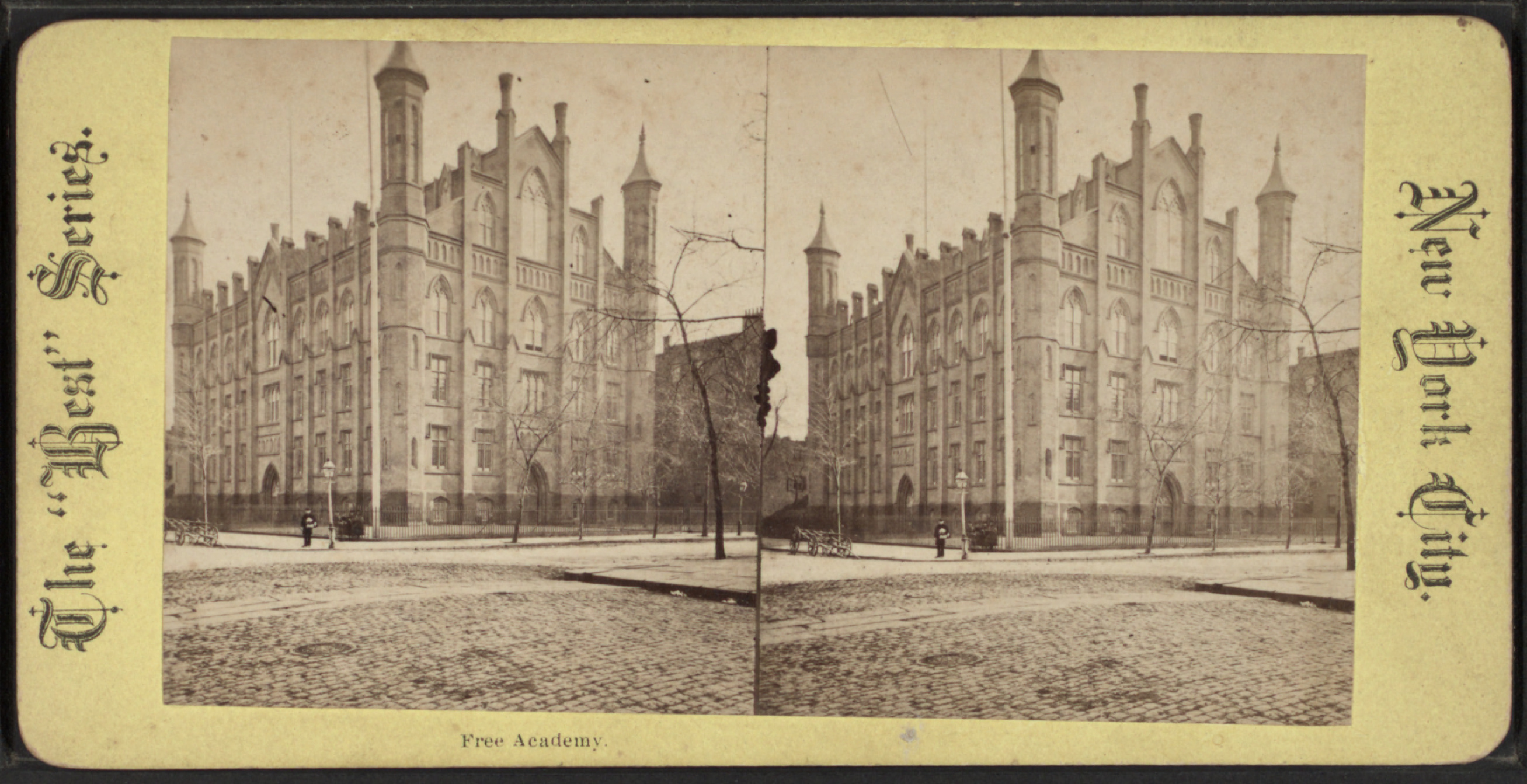
Free Academy Building (1847–1849), City College of New York, James Renwick Jr., architect.

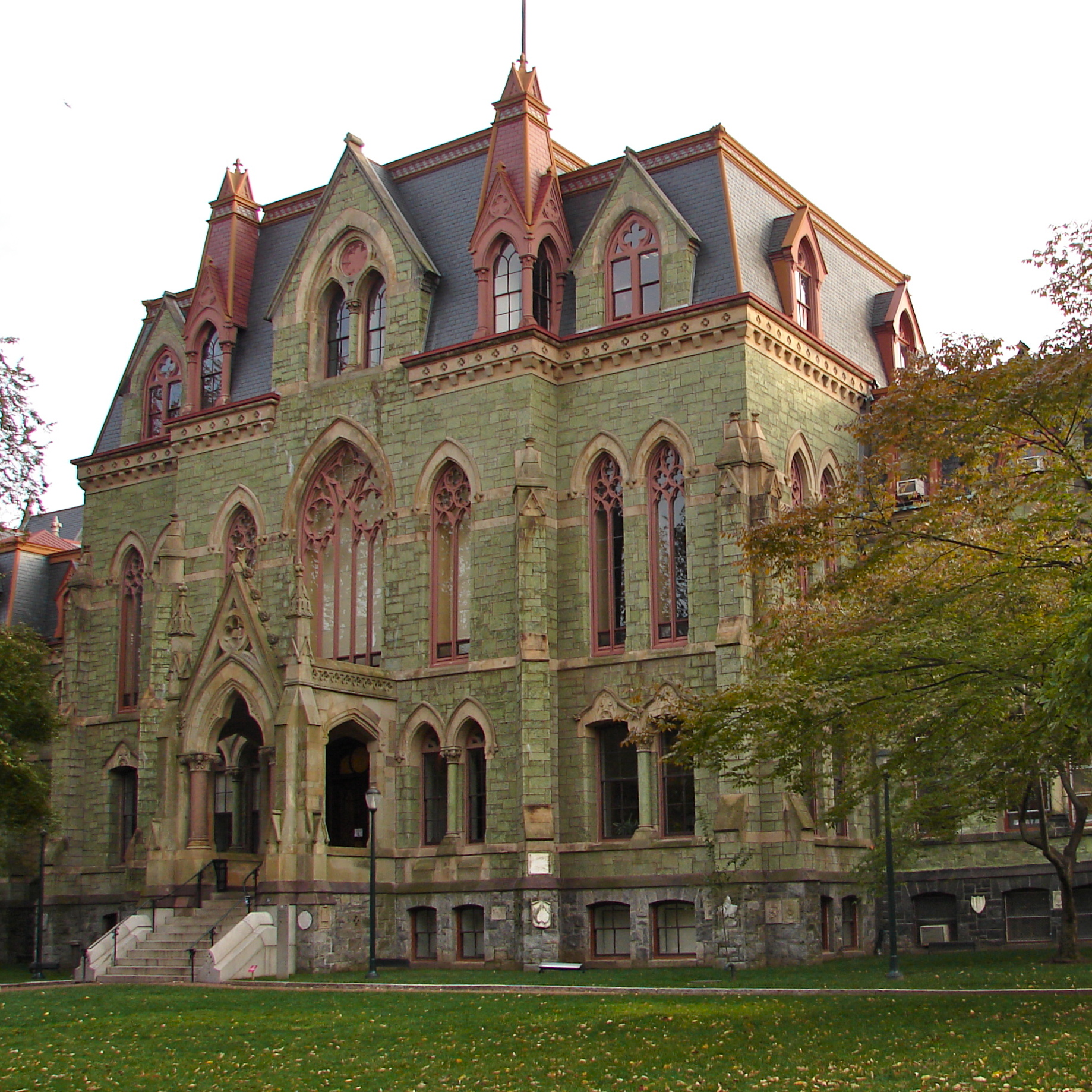
College Hall (1870–1872), University of Pennsylvania, Thomas W. Richards, architect.

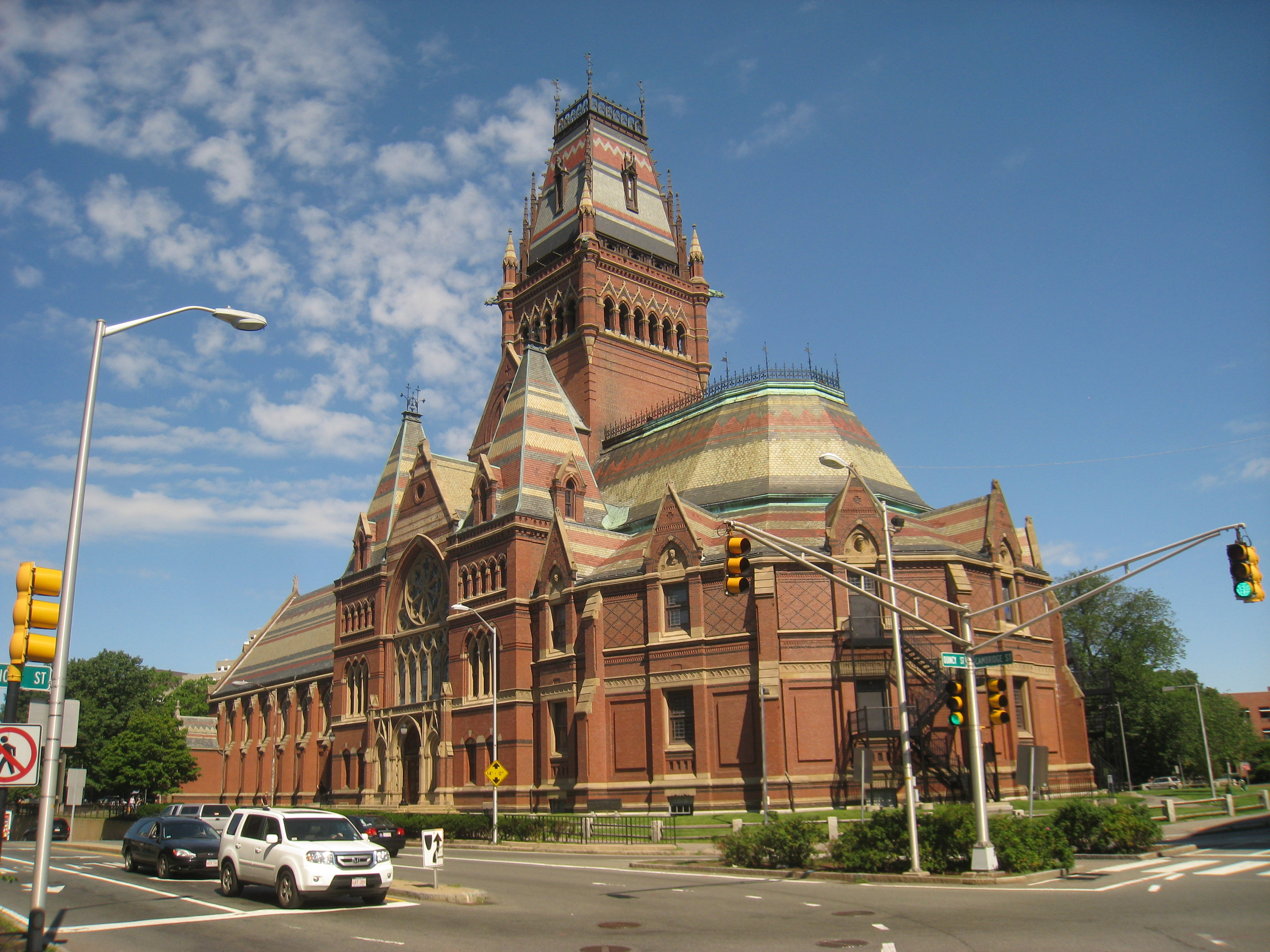
Memorial Hall (1870–1877), Harvard University, William Robert Ware & Henry Van Brunt, architects.

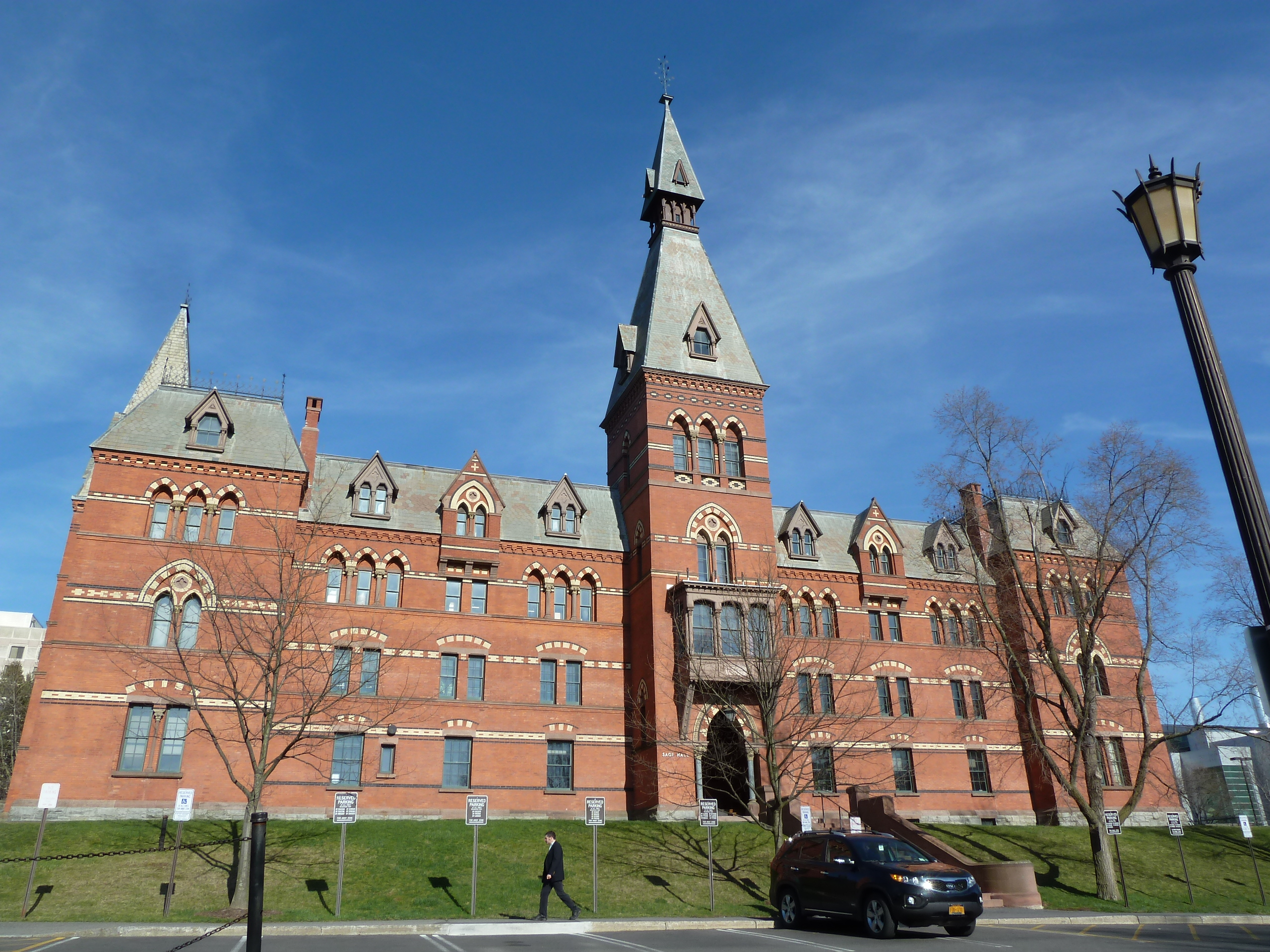
Sage Hall (1871–1875), Cornell University, Charles Babcock, architect.

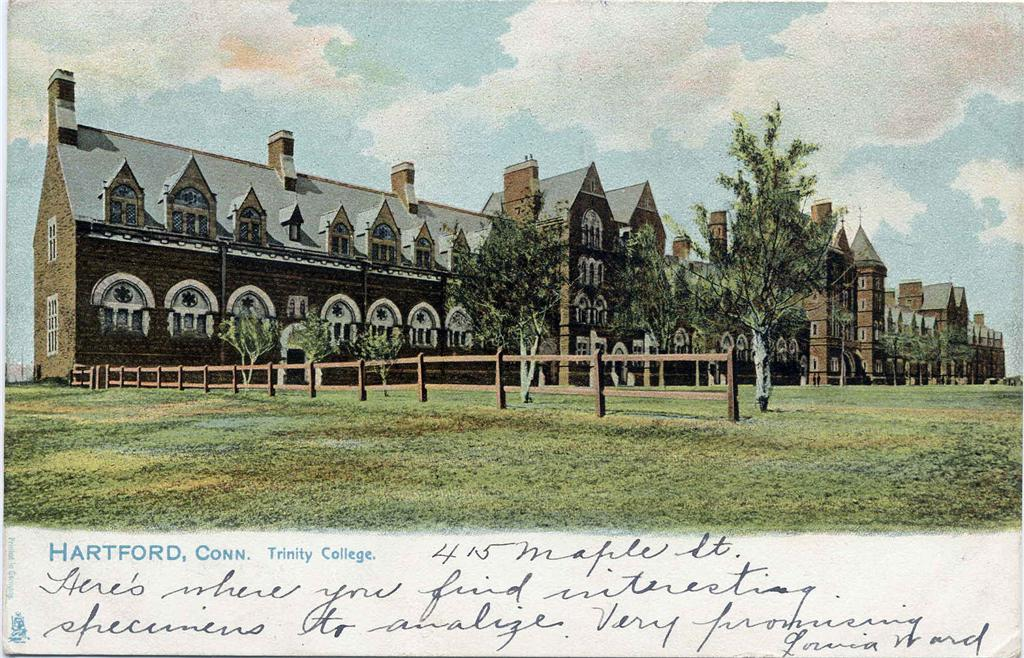
Seabury Hall, Northam Tower, Jarvis Hall (1871–1878), Trinity College, William Burges, architect.

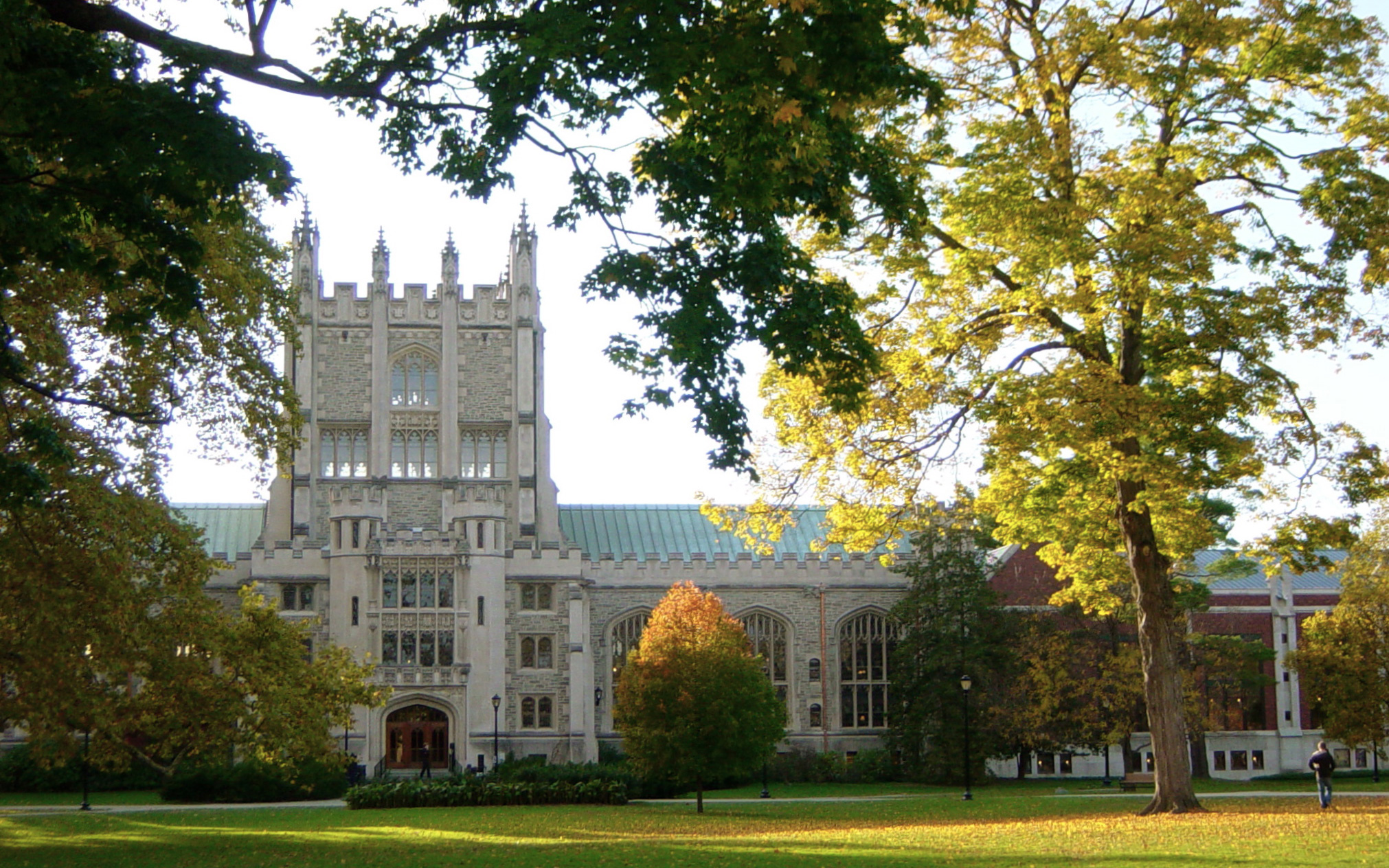
Thompson Memorial Library (1903–1905), Vassar College, Allen & Collens, architects.

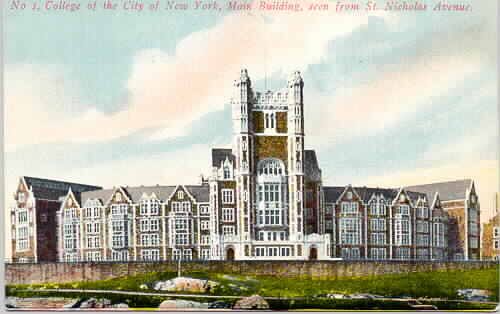
Shephard Hall tower (1903–1907), City College of New York, George Browne Post, architect.

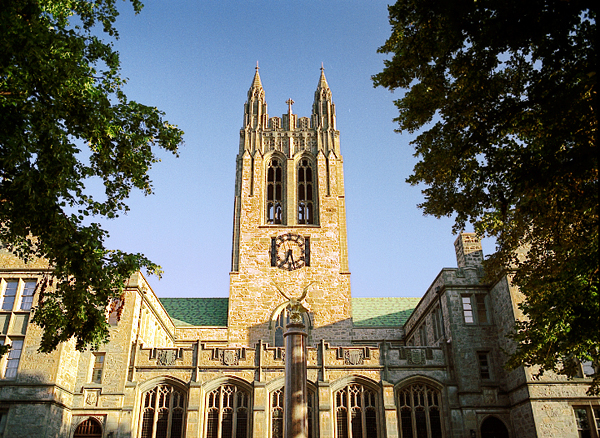
Gasson Hall, Boston College

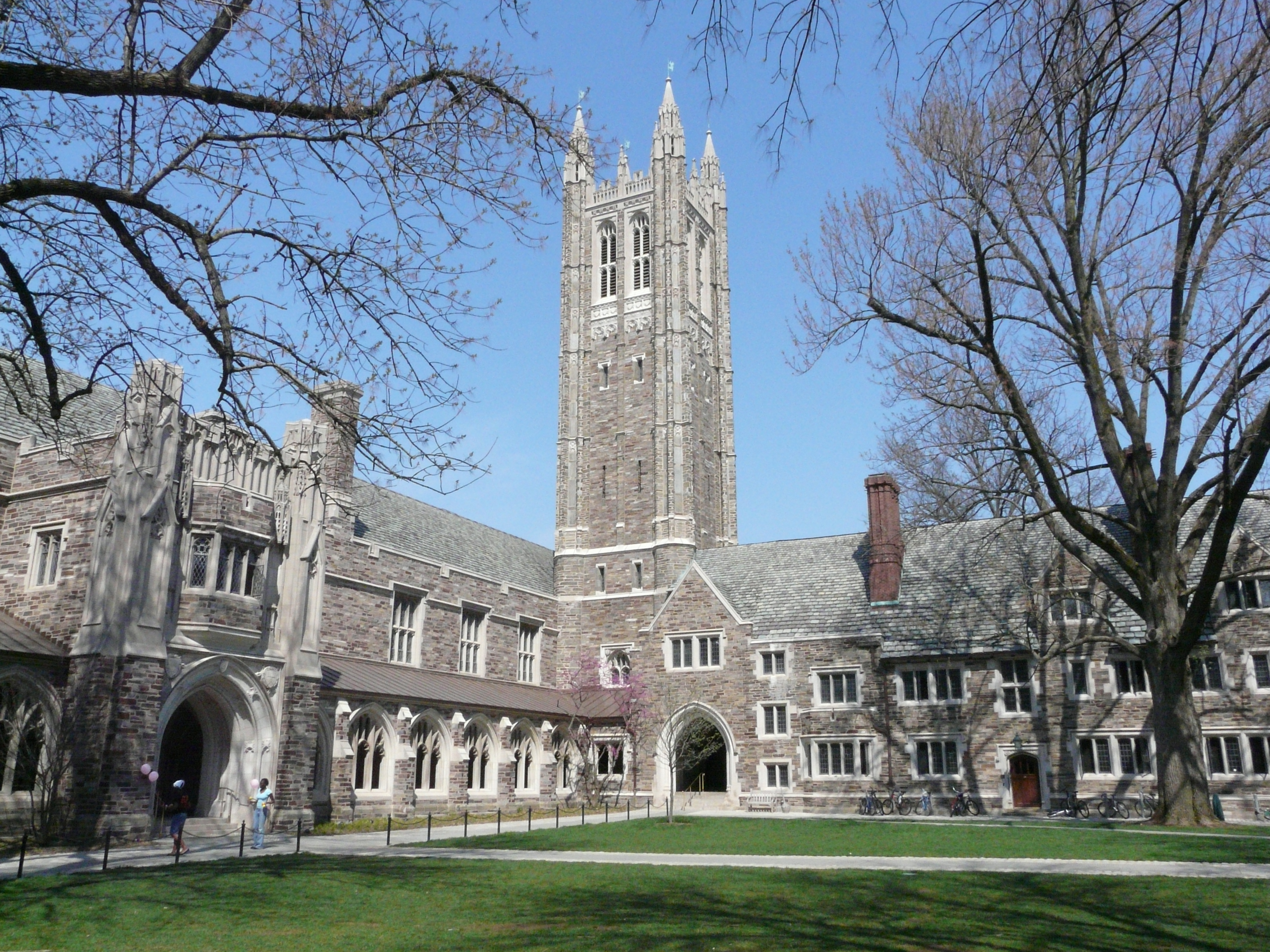
Holder Hall, Princeton University (1909–1911).

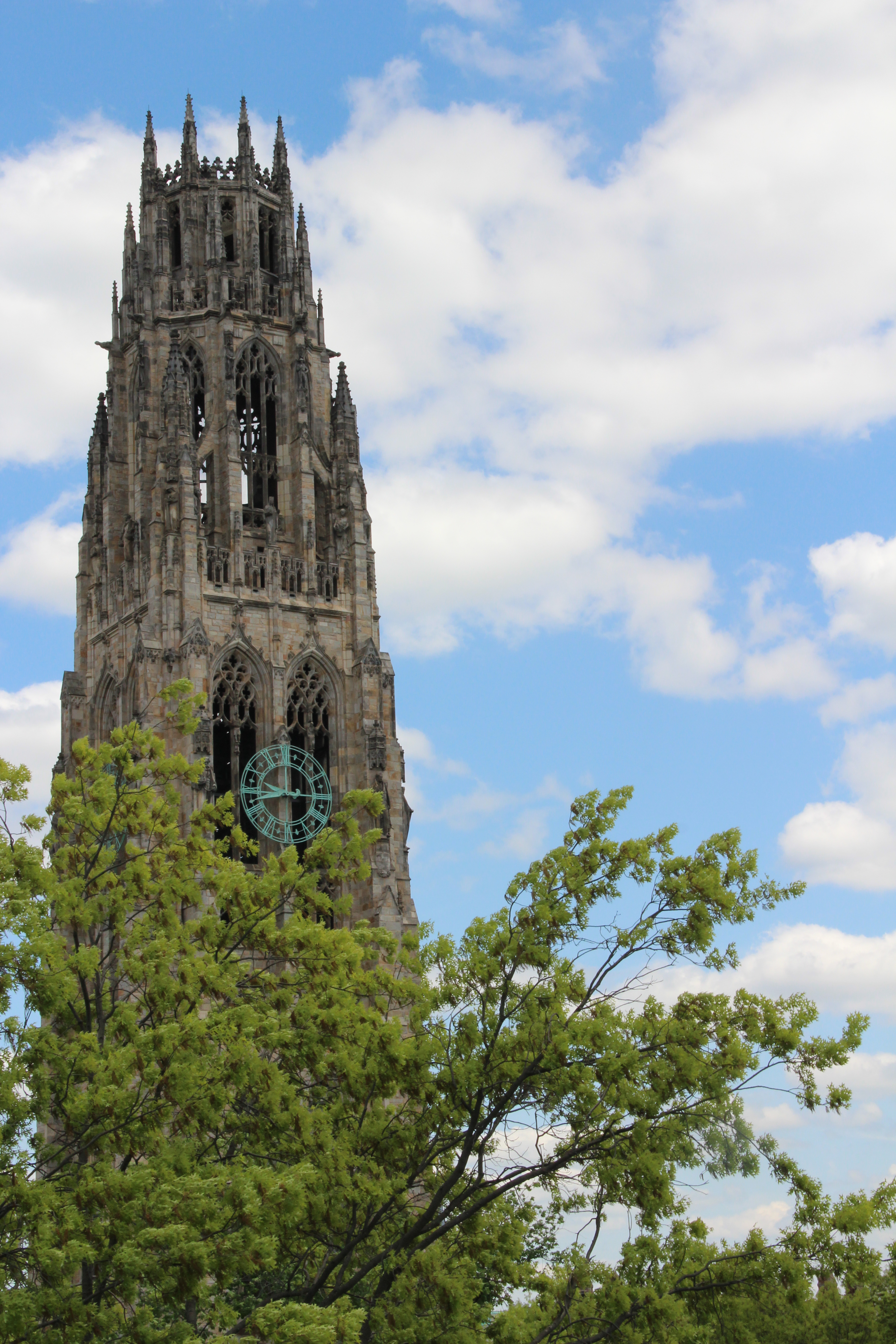
Harkness Tower at Yale University, James Gamble Rogers, architect

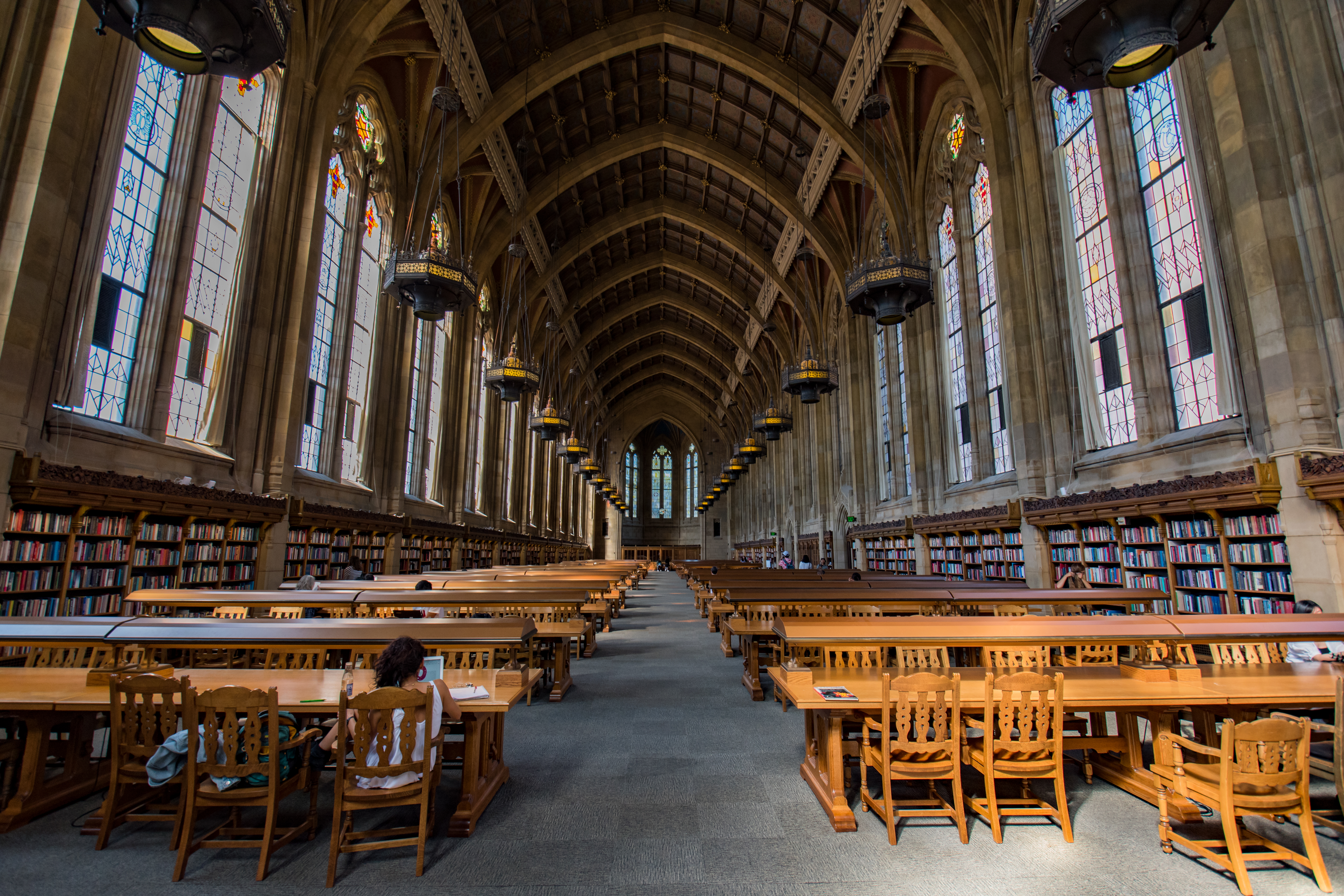
Suzzallo Library (1922–1926), University of Washington in Seattle, Charles Bebb and Carl F. Gould, architects

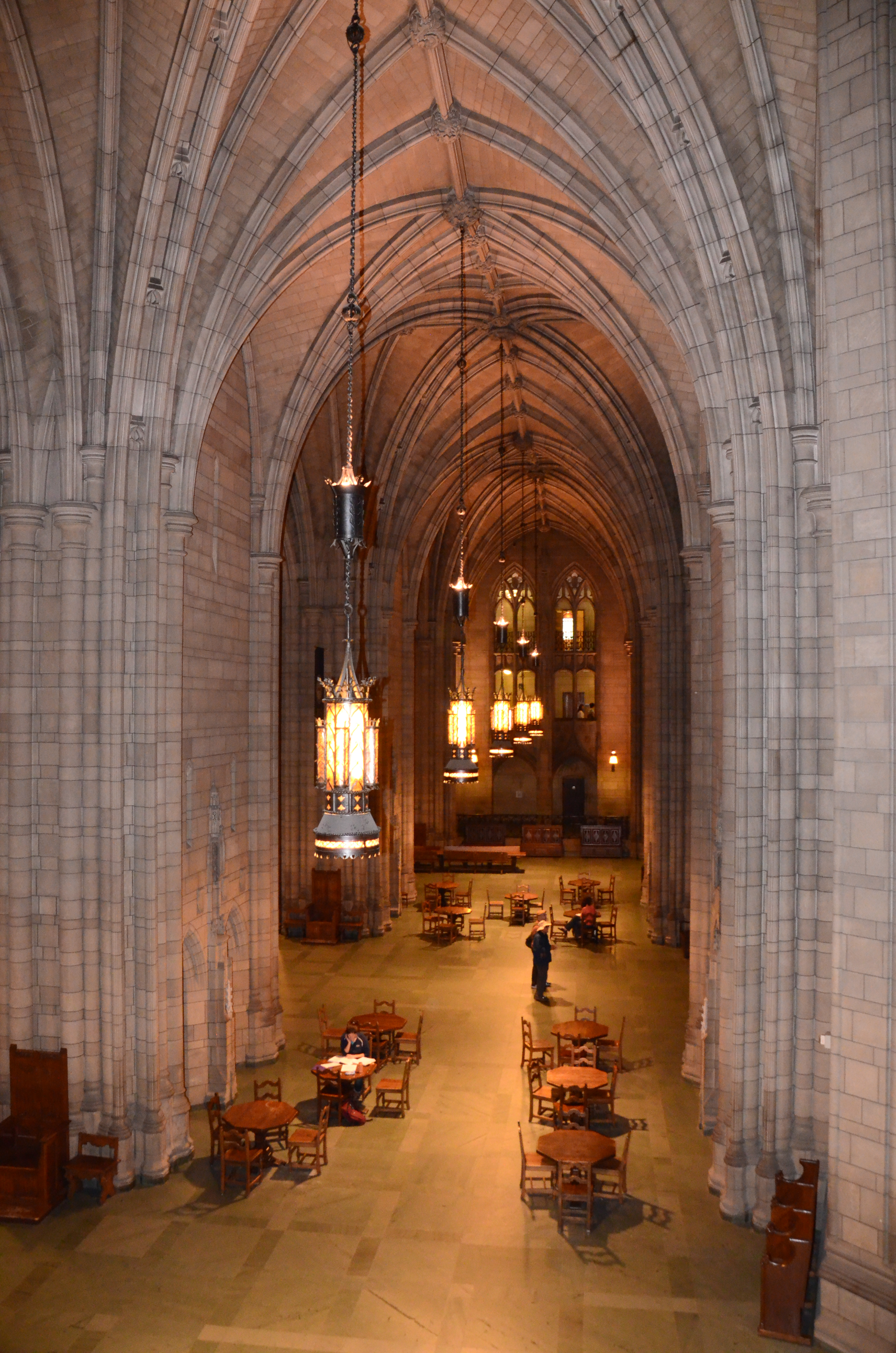
Cathedral of Learning (1926–1937), University of Pittsburgh, Charles Klauder, architect.

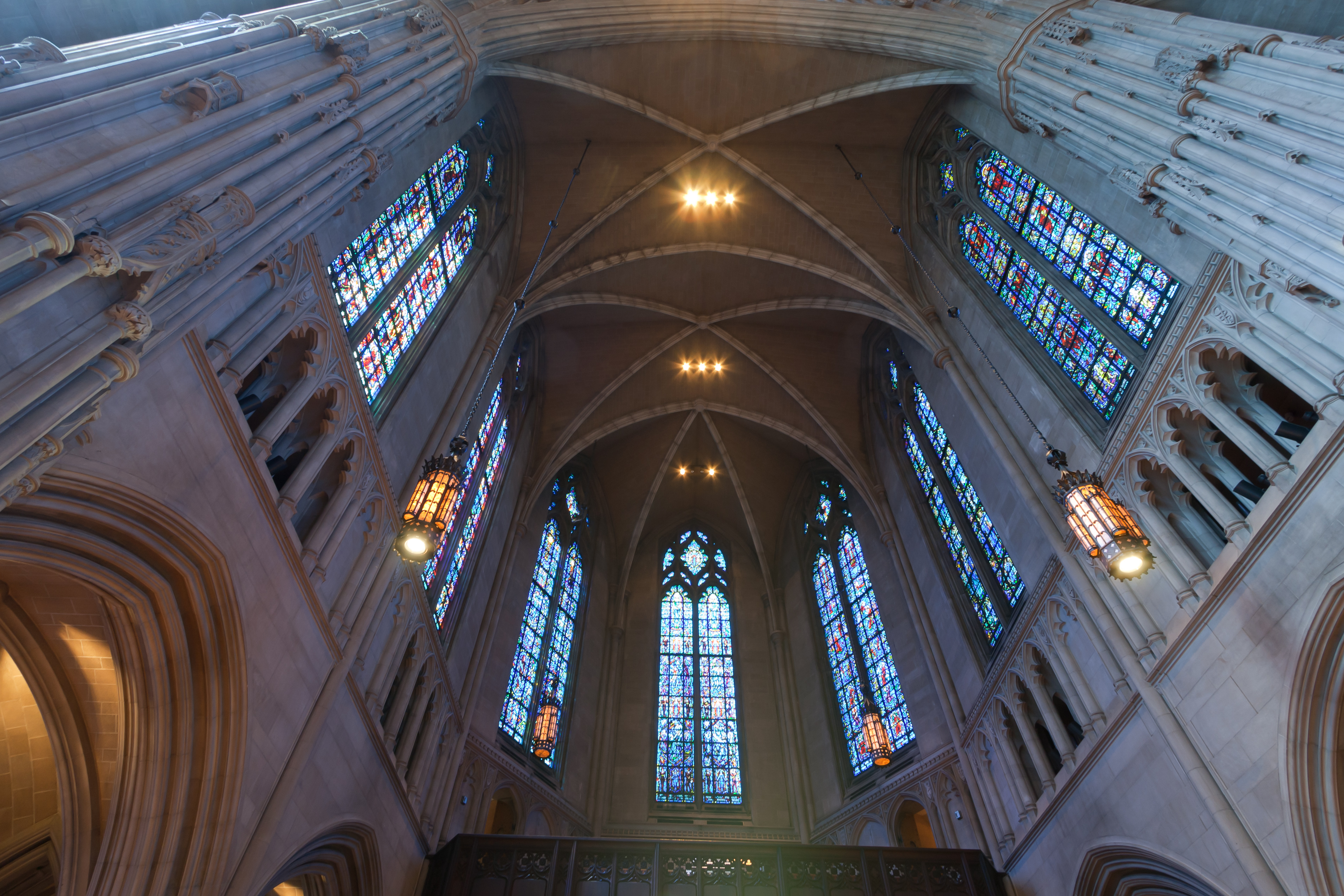
Heinz Chapel (1933–1938), University of Pittsburgh, Charles Klauder, architect.

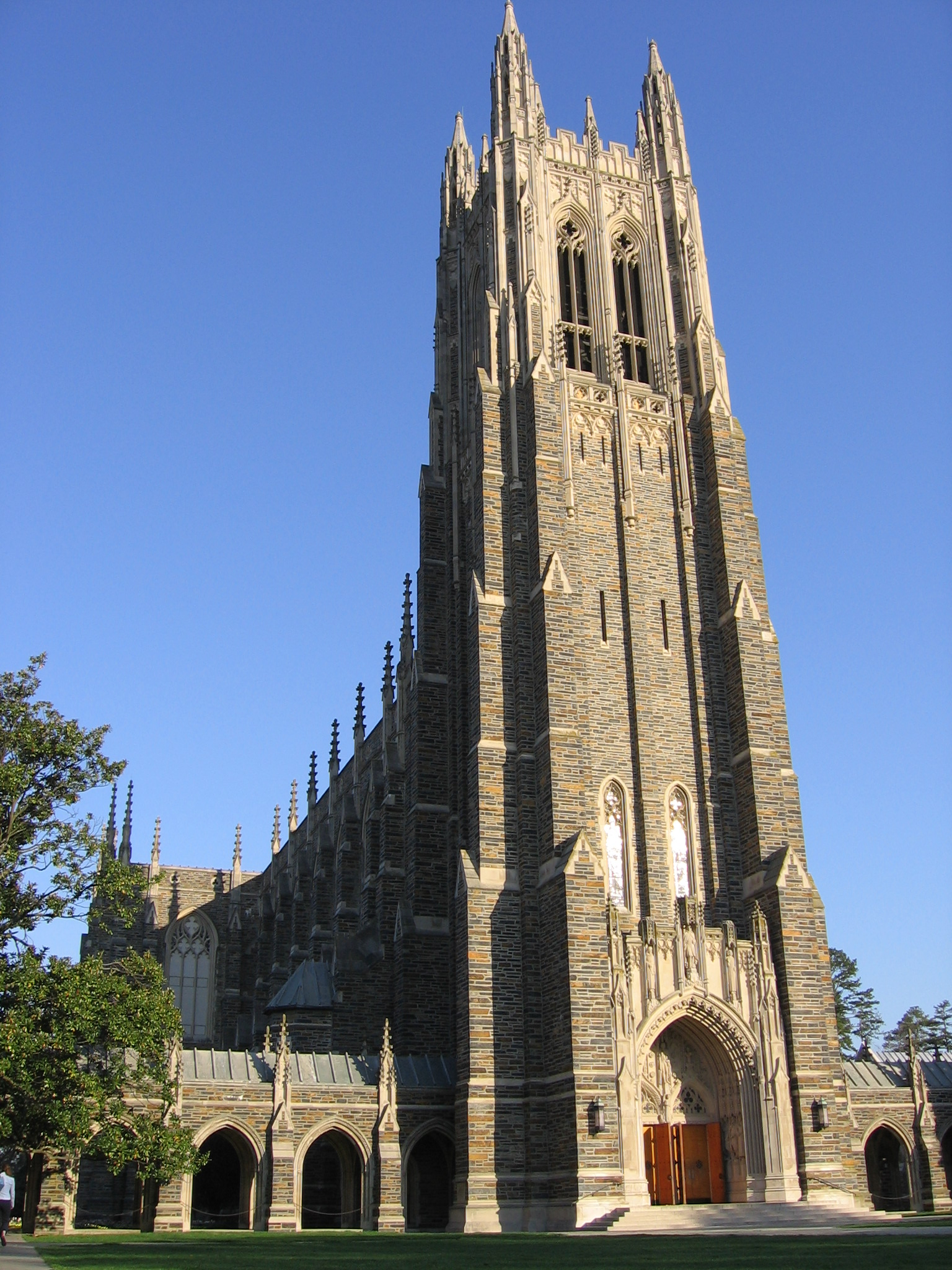
Duke Chapel (1930–1932) on West Campus of Duke University, Julian Abele and Horace Trumbauer, architects

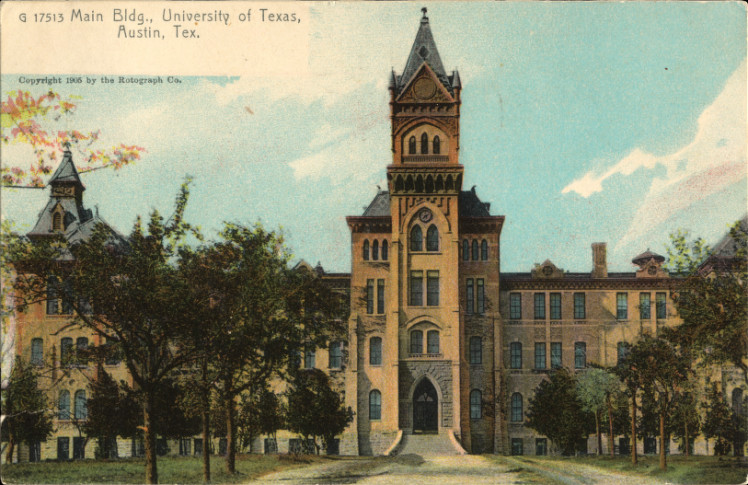
Old Main Building, University of Texas, Austin, Texas (1882–1934); Frederick Ernst Ruffini, architect; Abner Cook, contractor

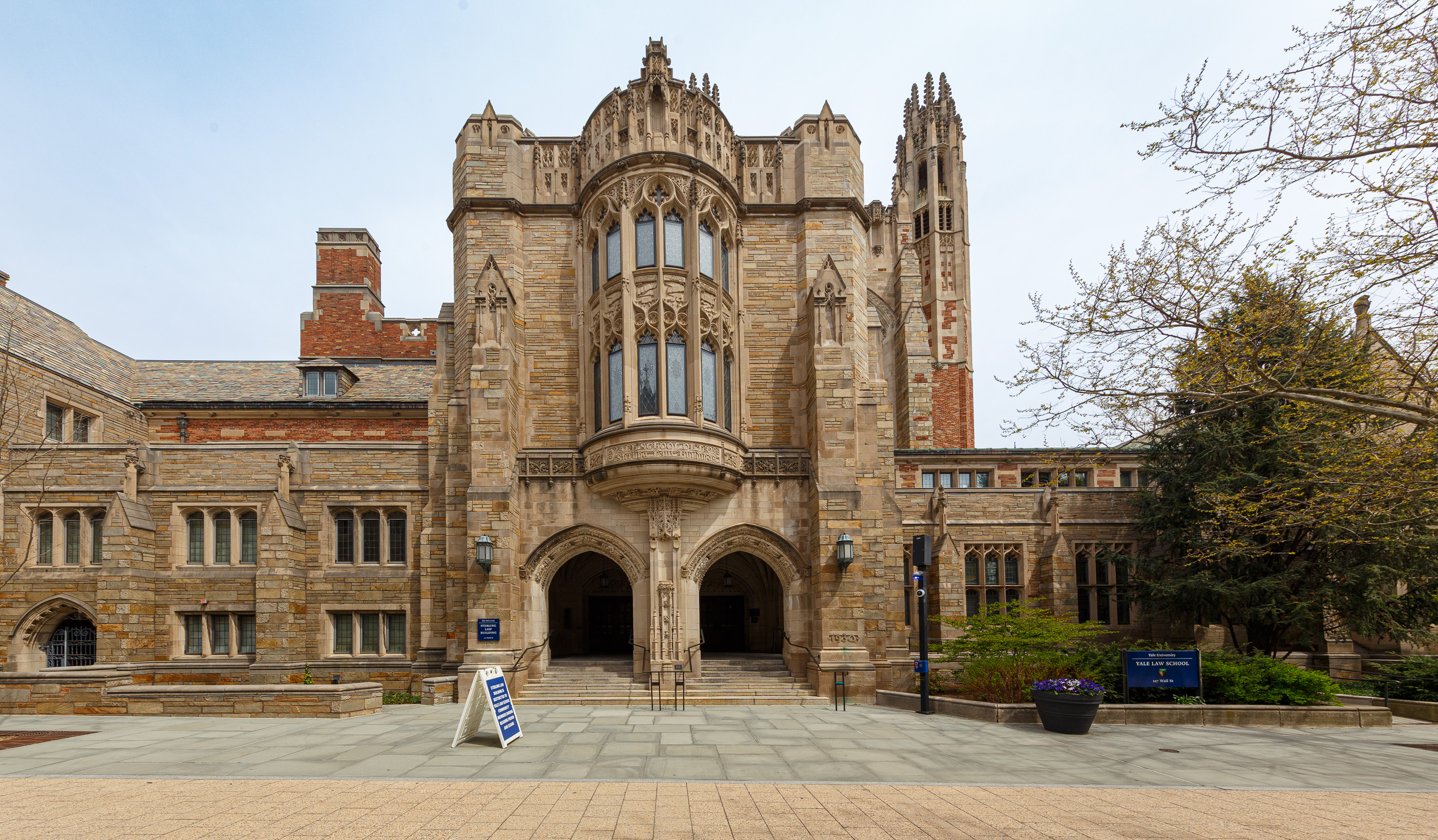
Sterling Law Building at Yale Law School, James Gamble Rogers, architect

== See also ==
- Gothic architecture
- Gothic Revival architecture
- Carpenter Gothic

== Sources ==
- Bergin, T. G. Yale's Residential Colleges; the First Fifty Years. New Haven, CT: Yale University Press, 1983.
- Duke, Alex. Importing Oxbridge. New Haven: Yale University Press, 2006. ISBN 0300067615
- Lewis, Michael J., The Gothic Revival (London: Thames & Johnson Ltd., 2002). ISBN 0-500-20359-8
- Robinson, Deborah and Edmund P. Meade. "Traditional Becomes Modern: the Rise of Collegiate Gothic Architecture at American Universities." Conference paper presented at 'Second International Congress on Construction History', Queens' College, Cambridge University; 2006.
