= Park Vista =

Coordinates: 47°40′19″N 122°18′43″W

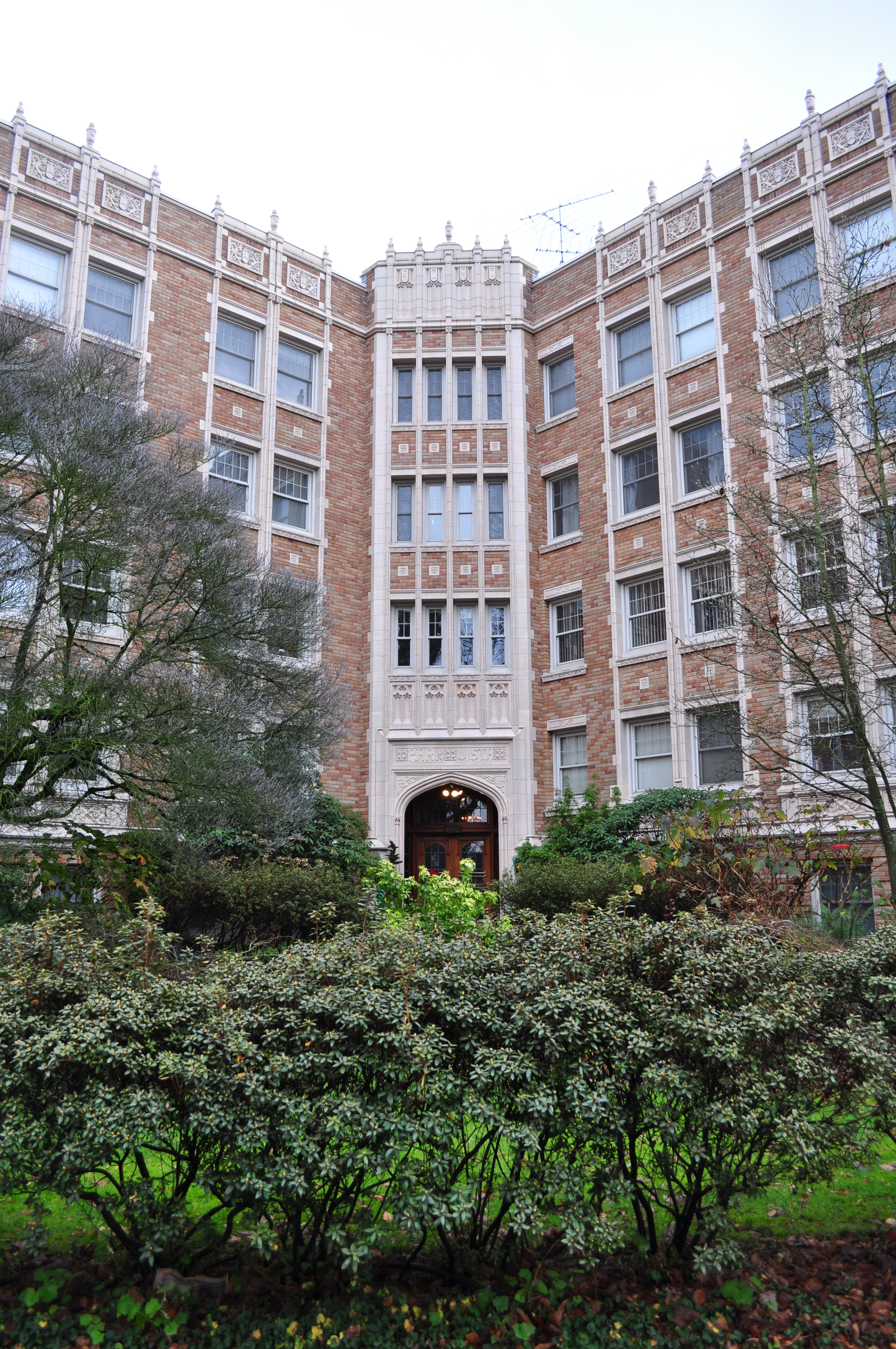
Park Vista

The Park Vista is a historic building in Seattle, Washington. It is situated on a triangular parcel whose full address is 5810 Cowen Pl. N.E., Seattle, WA 98105. To the northwest is Cowen Park and beyond that the Roosevelt neighborhood; to the south is the northern extreme of the University District; and to the east is the Ravenna neighborhood. The building's entrance and garden lie along the hypotenuse of the right-triangle and overlook Cowen Park.

== History ==
The Park Vista was designed by architect John A. Creutzer, who also designed Seattle's Medical Dental Building, the Swedish Tabernacle Church, and the Julie Apartments, among many others. Creutzer worked as an architect in Minneapolis, Minnesota and Spokane, Washington before settling in Seattle in 1906. The architectural style of the Park Vista is Collegiate Gothic. Construction was finished in September 1928 by builder A. S. Hainsworth at a cost of $350,000.

When new, the Park Vista offered views of the Olympic Mountains, which are now obstructed by trees in the park across the street. An advertisement in the September 14, 1928 University District Herald boasts many of the Park Vista's amenities, such as "built-in radio loudspeakers, dictaphone house phones, full automatic electric ranges, electric refrigeration, and roll-about beds."

The formal opening of the Park Vista was held on Sunday September 16, 1928, and was attended by "crowds". According to the Herald, "Park Vista ranks favorably with the city's newest and finest apartments".

The building was converted from rental apartments into an owner-occupied cooperative in 1949 (?) by a group of residents including attorney Ella Hanson. A housing cooperative or co-op is a form of group ownership similar in many respects to a condominium. As of 2019, the building is operated as a cooperative.

== Gallery ==
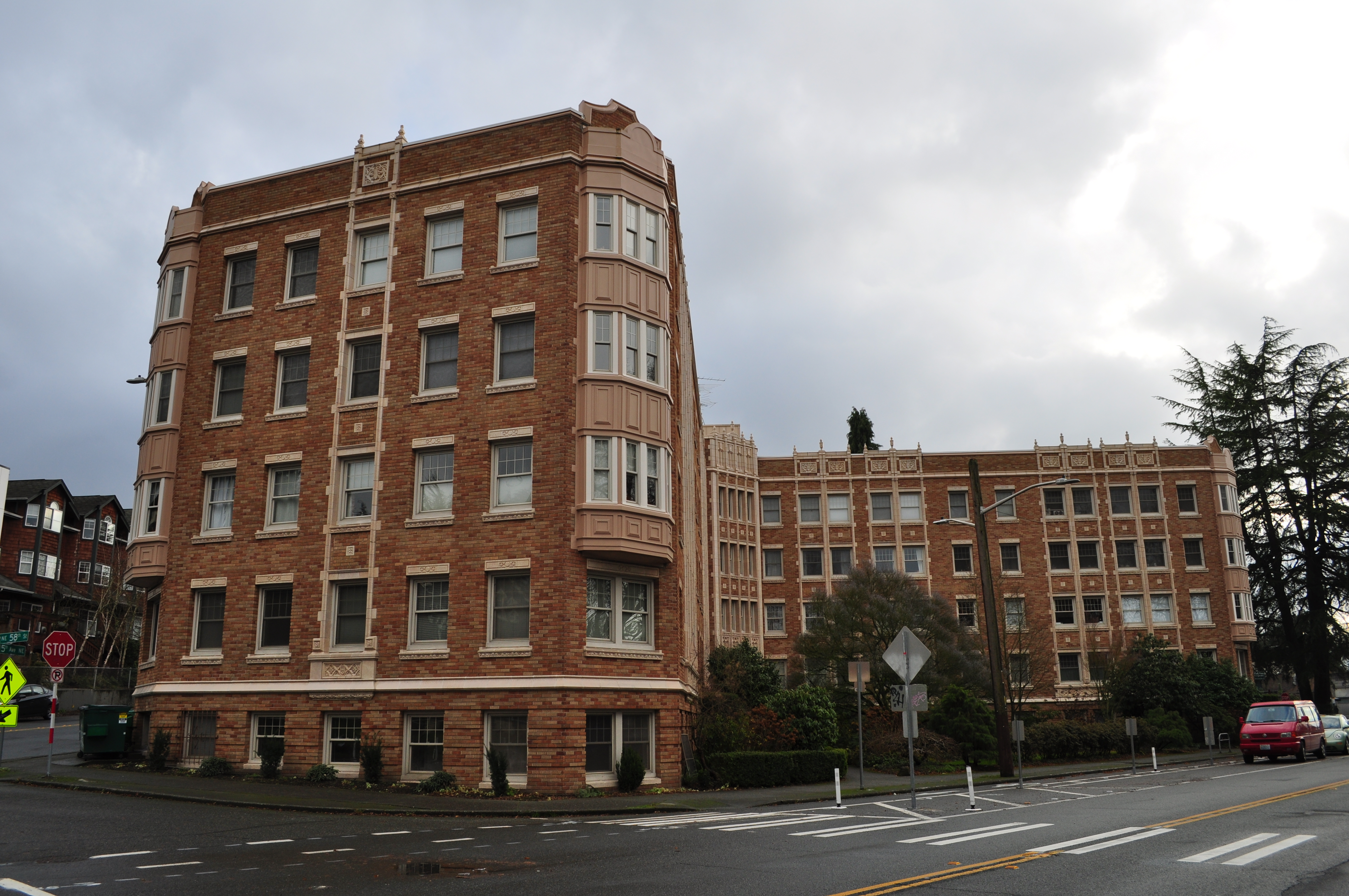

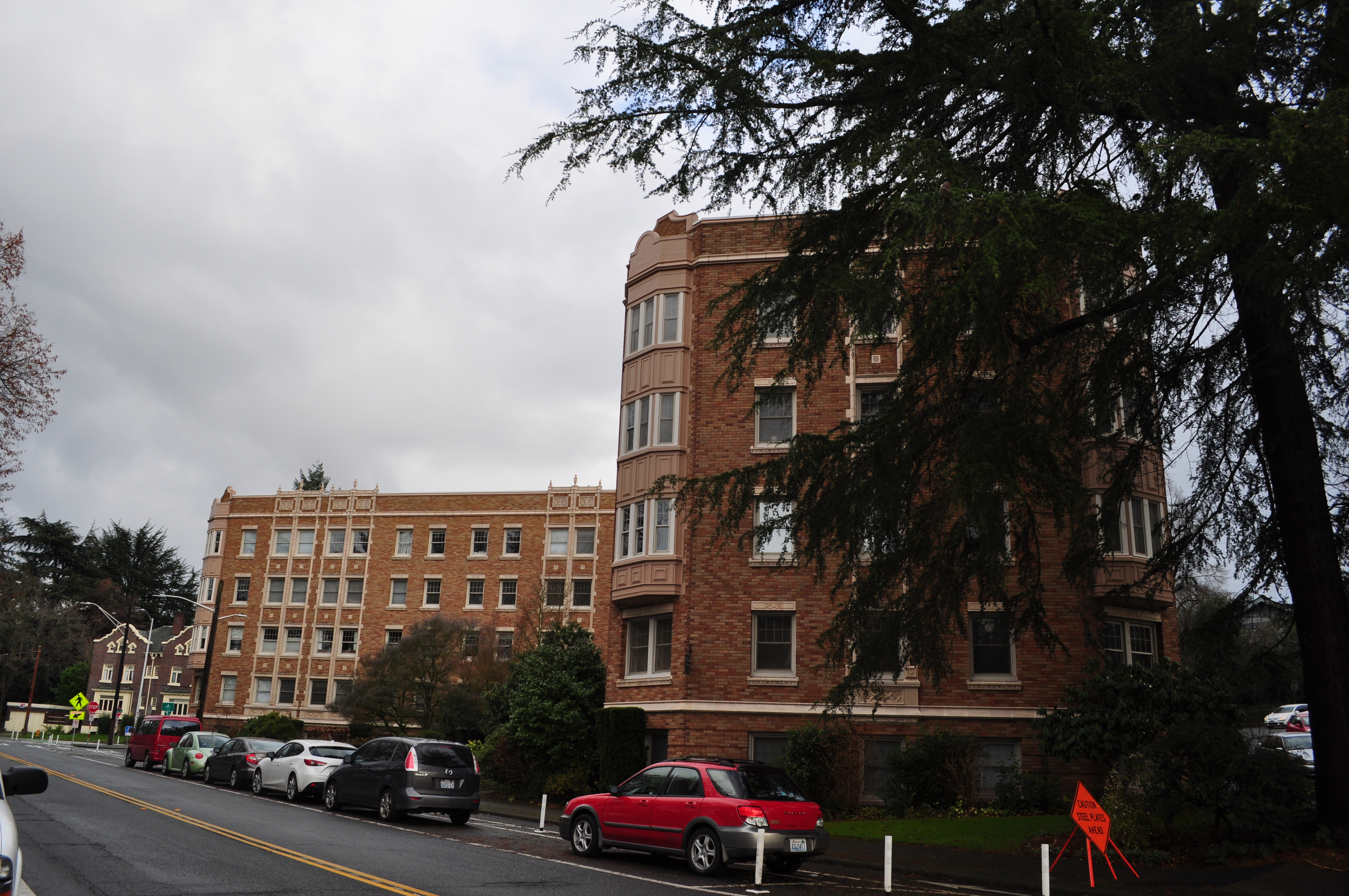

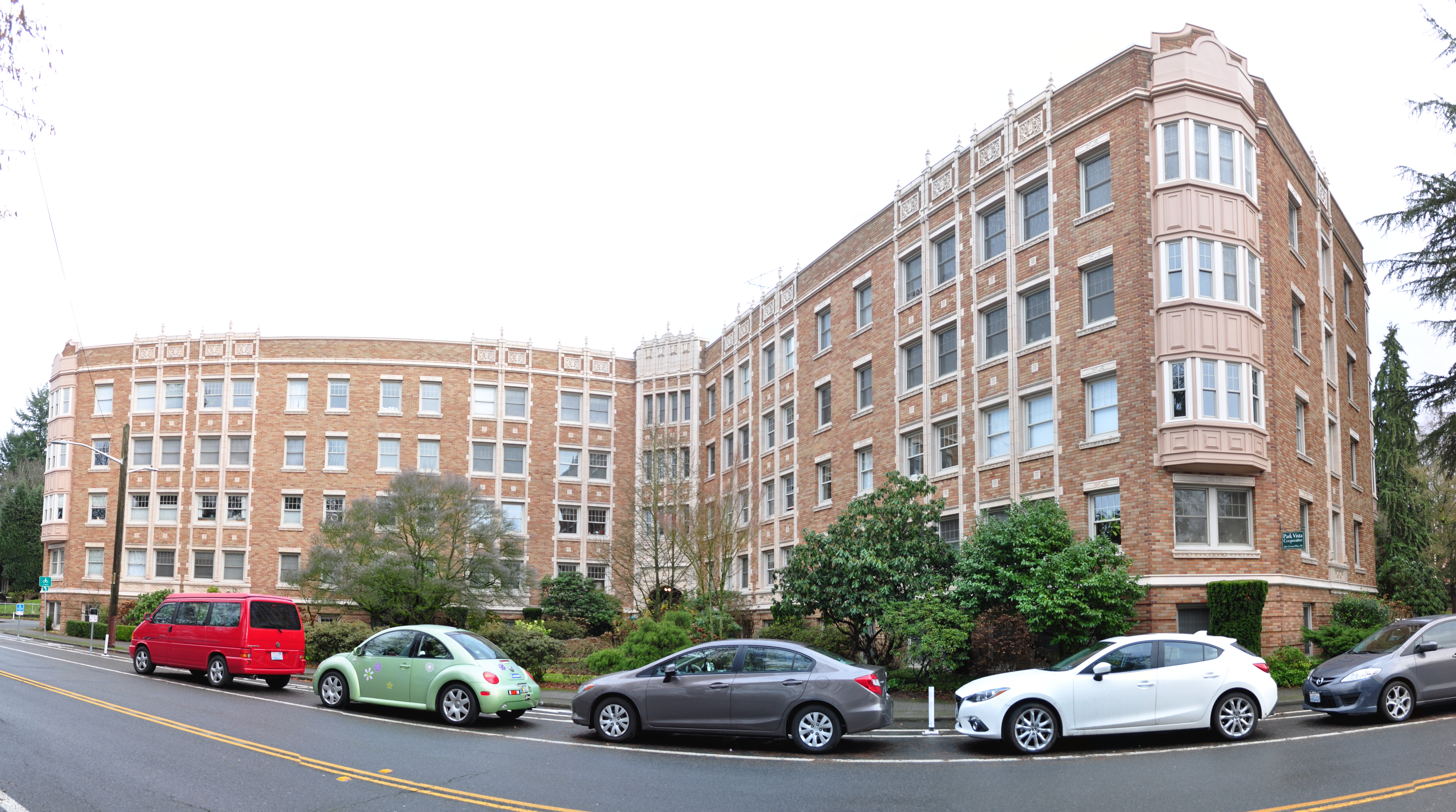

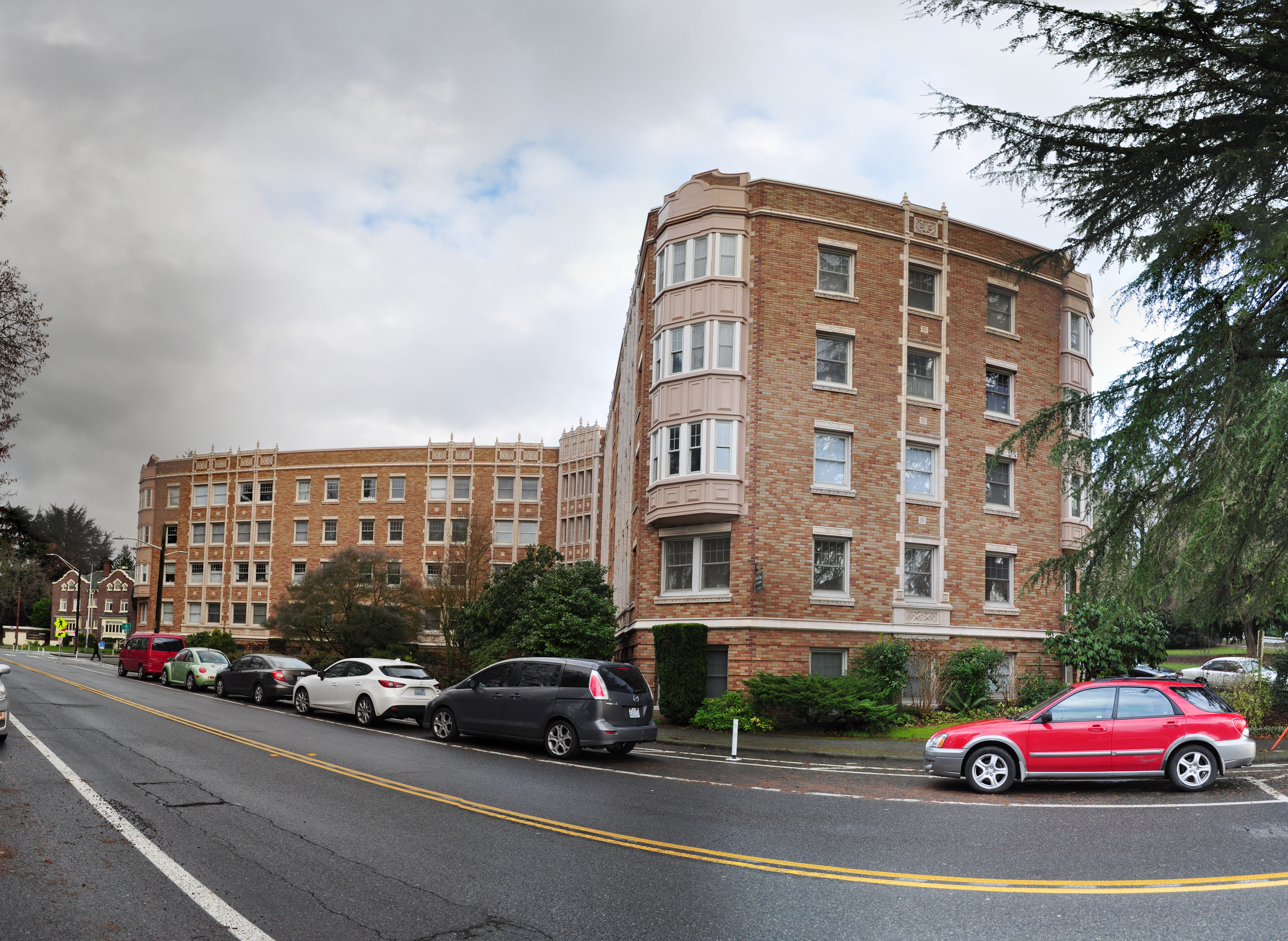

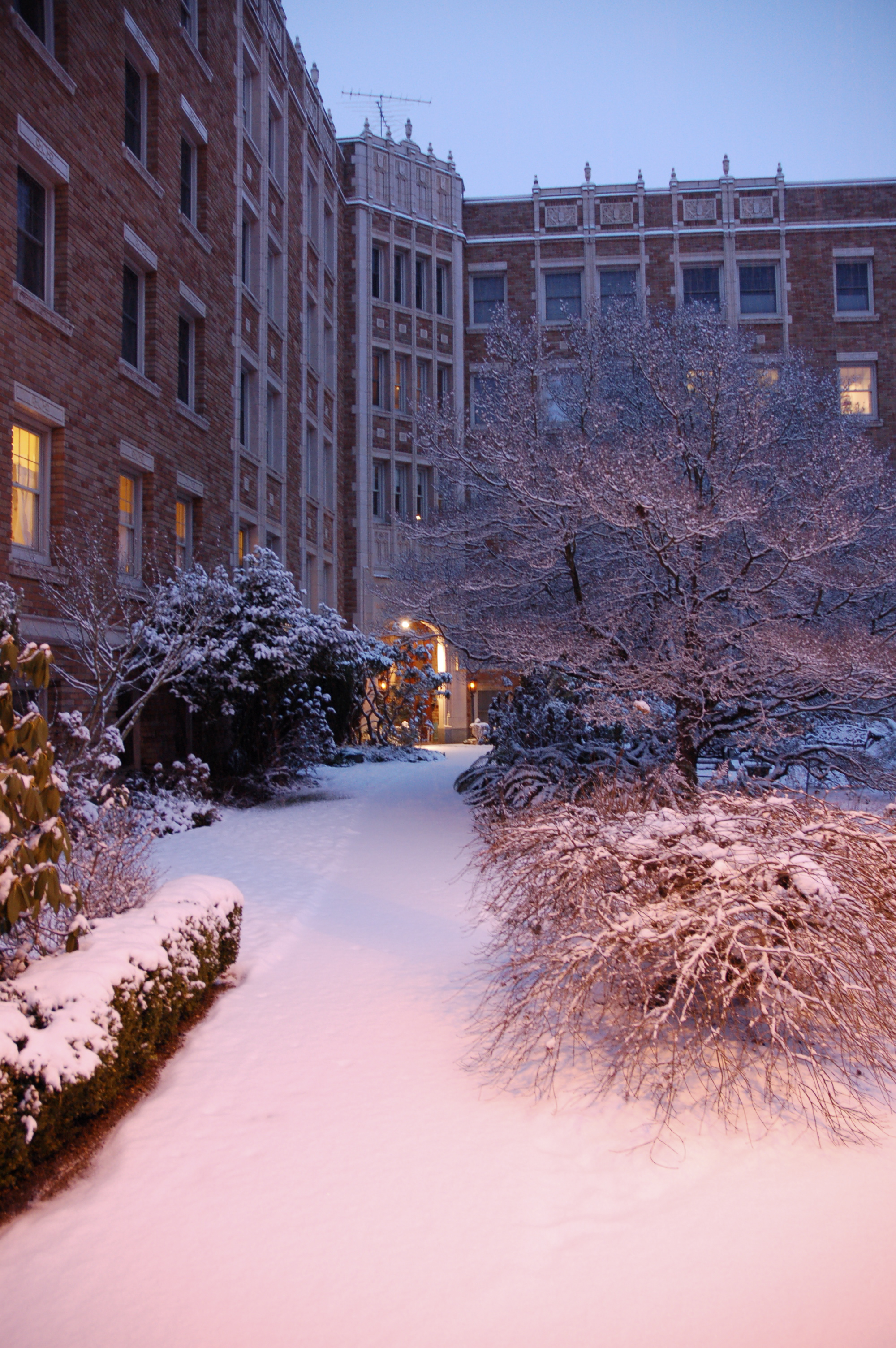
