= Trinity College Long Walk =

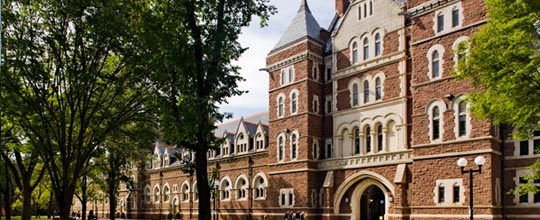
Seabury Hall (left) and Northam Tower (right)

The Trinity College Long Walk is a trio of conjoined buildings that form the core of Trinity College's campus in Hartford, Connecticut, United States. The three, Seabury Hall (built 1878), Northam Tower (built 1883), and Jarvis Hall (built 1878), are the oldest buildings on the college's current campus.

== History ==
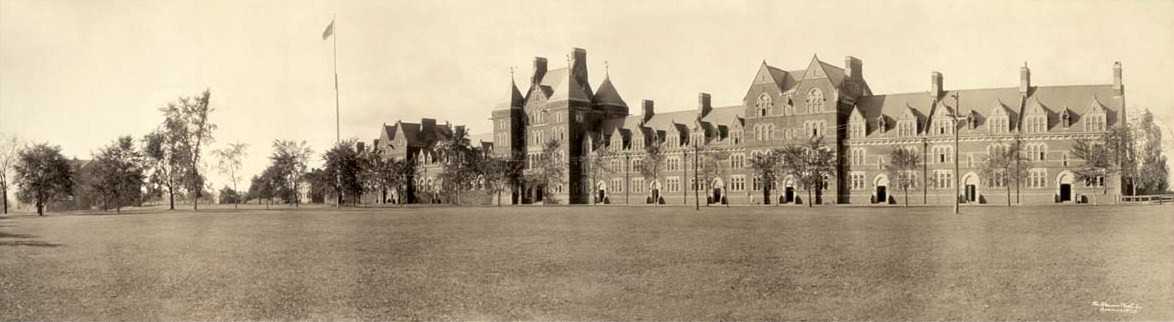
Trinity College in 1909, showing the Long Walk and three attached buildings: Northam (center), Jarvis (right), Seabury (left)

The three buildings forming the Long Walk were the first to be constructed on Trinity's Gallows Hill Campus after the College's move in the 1870s from its downtown campus (currently the site of the State Capitol). "In an ambitious gesture, then President Abner Jackson chose William Burges, one of England's leading architects, to design the new buildings. Burges never traveled to the United States, and Francis Hatch Kimball served as the local architect. The Long Walk was executed in the High Victorian Gothic style, popular in England and the United States in the second half of the 19th century. The Long Walk set the pace for the appearance of the campus's future buildings. Burges had wanted the buildings to be arranged in quadrangular fashion, but his plans were drastically cut back to form a long bar-like range, whose bold silhouette dominates the central green space of the campus known as The Quad."

There are two markers on the long walk commemorating presidential visits. The first, commemorating a 1954 visit by President Dwight D. Eisenhower, is marked in a Greek inscription within a triangular planting and is located in front of Downes Memorial Clock Tower. The second marker, commemorating the 1918 visit of President Theodore Roosevelt, is midway down the Long Walk and adjacent to the Fuller Arch and the Wall of Honor. The Latin inscription is embedded in the sidewalk in front of Northam Tower. Tradition has it that any student who walk on the plaque will not graduate from Trinity. When graduating seniors process at commencement, they all walk on this plaque.

In 2008 the Long Walk underwent a $32.7 million renovation. The Long Walk is the only example of Burges's work in America and is considered to be one of the best example anywhere of Victorian Gothic collegiate architecture. It was listed on the National Register of Historic Places in 2024.

== Seabury Hall ==
Built in 1878, Seabury Hall is named after Samuel Seabury, the first American Episcopal bishop, the second Presiding Bishop of the Episcopal Church, USA, and the first Bishop of Connecticut. Seabury currently contains seminar rooms, class rooms, and professor's offices. When first built, Seabury contained the college's chapel, which has since been renovated into a lecture room, while retaining the chapel pews for student seating.

== Jarvis Hall ==
Built in 1878, Jarvis Hall is named after Abraham Jarvis, who was the second bishop of the Episcopal Diocese of Connecticut and eighth in succession of bishops in the Episcopal Church. Jarvis is currently used for student housing and contains six and eight person suites consisting of single and double dorm rooms and a large common room. It is rumored that the doubles were originally designed for students while the singles across the hallway were intended for their servants. In actuality, the single rooms were single bedrooms that opened into living areas, which are currently the doubles and the hallway, and six rooms retain this layout. As of the 2008 school year, the massive Long Walk Reconstruction project was completed, and the dorms are built in a classic style. The basement of Jarvis contains student meeting and study rooms.

== Northam Tower ==
This is the central tower on the Long Walk, with its distinctive Fuller archway. Northam was built after Seabury and Jarvis Halls and was meant to connect to the two buildings. It contains upperclassman housing in the form of one and two room doubles. The National Fraternity of Alpha Chi Rho was founded in a room within Northam Tower. Under the Fuller archway is the Trinity College Wall of Honor, which lists important benefactors of the school.
